= History of the floppy disk =

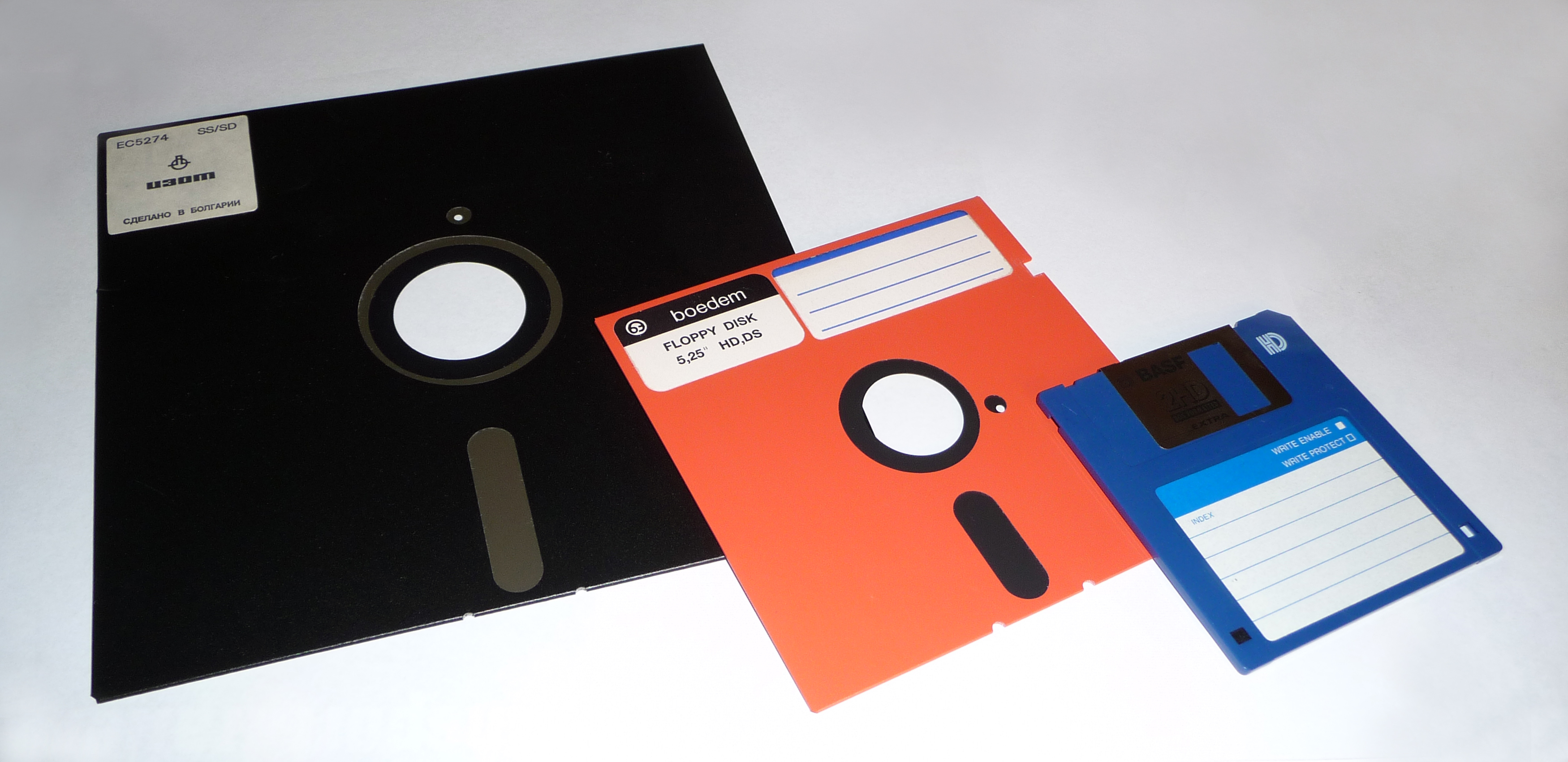

A floppy disk is a disk storage medium composed of a thin and flexible magnetic storage medium encased in a rectangular plastic carrier. It is read and written using a floppy disk drive (FDD). Floppy disks were an almost universal data format from the 1970s into the 1990s, used for primary data storage as well as for backup and data transfers between computers.

In 1967, at an IBM facility in San Jose, California, work began on a drive that led to the world's first floppy disk and disk drive. It was introduced into the market in an 8-inch (203 mm) format in 1971. The more conveniently sized 5¼-inch disks were introduced in 1976, and became almost universal on dedicated word processing systems and personal computers. This format was more slowly replaced by the 3½-inch format, first introduced in 1982. There was a significant period where both were popular. The dimensions are nominal, the actual cartridge sizes are 130 mm (5.12 in) and 90 mm (3.54 in) respectively, while the disks themselves are somewhat smaller. A number of other variant sizes were introduced over time, with limited market success.

Floppy disks remained a popular medium for nearly 40 years, but their use was declining by the mid- to late 1990s. After 2000, floppy disks were increasingly rare and used primarily with older hardware, especially with legacy industrial and musical equipment.

Sony manufactured its last new floppy disks in 2011.

== 8-inch floppy ==
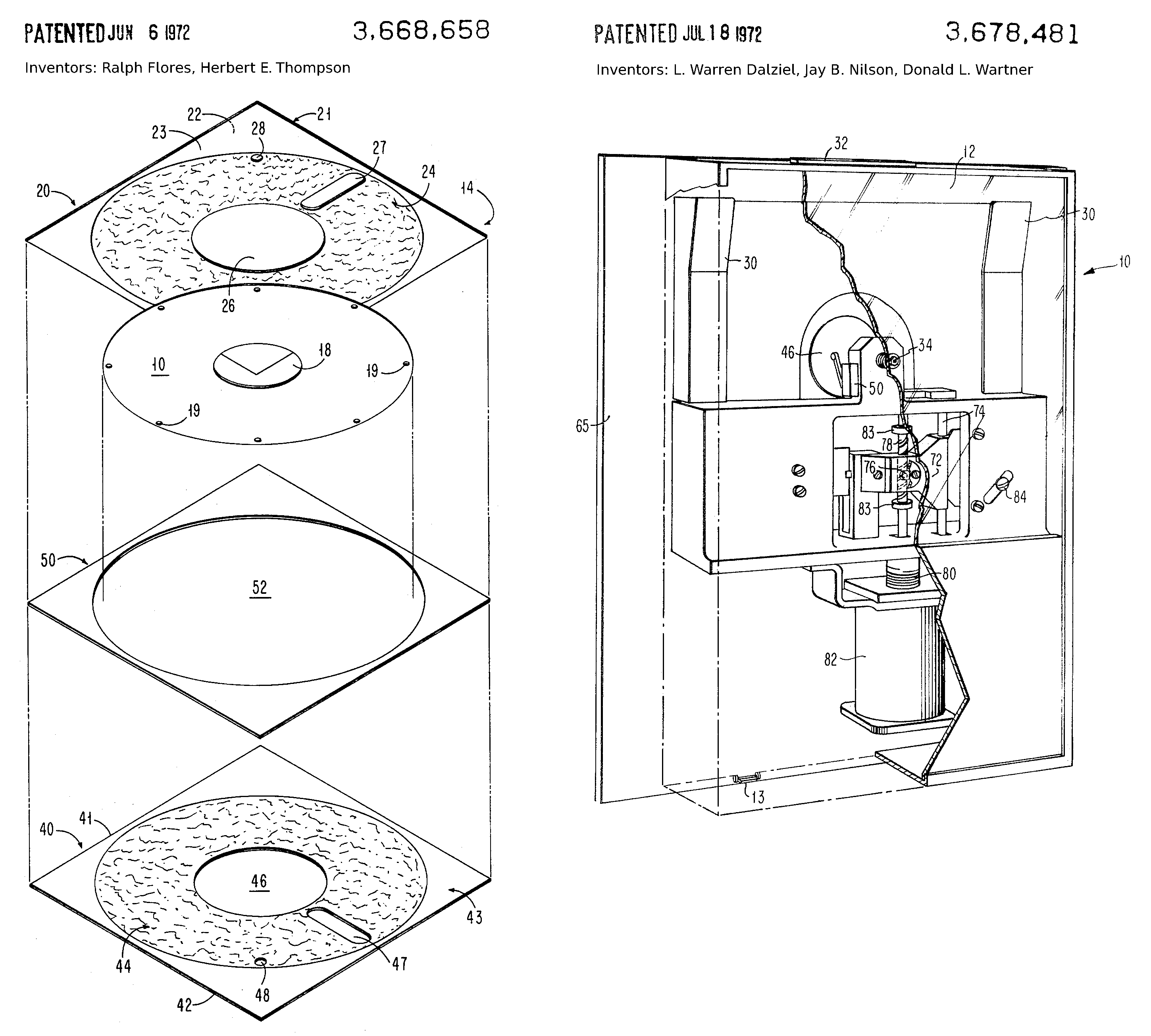
Drawings from IBM Floppy Disk Drive Patents

=== Origin as a read-only floppy disk ===
IBM's decision in the late 1960s to use RAM as the writeable control store for future systems and control units created a requirement for an inexpensive and reliable read-only device and associated medium to store and ship the control store's microprogram, and at system power-on to load the microprogram into the control store. The objective was a read-only device costing less than $200, and a medium costing less than $5.

IBM San Jose's Direct Access Storage Product Manager, Alan Shugart, assigned the job to David L. Noble, who tried to develop a new-style tape for the purpose, but without success. The project was reassigned to Donald L. Wartner, 23FD Disk Drive manager, and Herbert E. Thompson, 23FD Disk manager, along with design engineers Warren L. Dalziel, Jay Brent Nilson, and Ralph Flores; and that team developed the IBM 23FD Floppy Disk Drive System (code name Minnow). The disk is a read-only, 8-inch-diameter (200 mm) flexible diskette called the "memory disk" holding 80 kilobytes of data. Initially the disk was bare, but dirt became a serious problem so they enclosed it in a plastic envelope lined with fabric that would remove dust particles. The Floppy Disk Drive Patent #3,678,481 was issued July 18, 1972 with named inventors L. Warren Dalziel, Jay. B. Nilson, and Donald L. Wartner. IBM introduced the diskette commercially in 1971. (Note: A Japanese inventor, Yoshiro Nakamatsu, claims to have invented core floppy disk technology in 1952 and further claims to have later licensed 16 patents to IBM for the creation of the floppy disk; however, there is no reliable source to support his assertions.)

The new device first shipped in 1971 as the 23FD, the control store load device of the 2835 Storage Control Unit. and then as a standard part of most System 370 processing units and other IBM products. Internally IBM used another device, code named Mackerel, to write floppy disks for distribution to the field.

=== Enhancement into a read/write floppy disk ===
Other suppliers recognized the opportunity for a read/write FDD in applications such as key entry and data logging. Shugart, by then at Memorex shipped the Memorex 650 in 1972, the first commercially available read-write floppy disk drive. The 650 had a data capacity of 175 kB, with 50 tracks and 8 sectors per track. The Memorex disk was hard sectored, that is, it contained 8 sector holes (plus one index hole) at the outer diameter (outside data track 00) to synchronize the beginning of each data sector and the beginning of a track. Most early 8" disks were hard sectored, meaning that they had a fixed number of disk sectors (usually 8, 16, or 32), marked by physical holes punched around the disk hub, and the drive required the correct media type for its controller.

IBM was developing a read/write FDD but did not see a market opportunity for such a device so came close to cancelling the project. A chance encounter in San Jose between IBM's Jack Harker and Don Stephenson the site manager of IBM's General Systems Division, Rochester MN, who needed a product to compete with Mohawk's key to tape system led to the production of IBM's first read/write FDD, the 33FD code named "IGAR." The 33FD first shipped in May 1973 as a component of the 3740 Data Entry System, designed to directly replace IBM's punched card ("keypunch") data entry machines. The medium sold separately as "Diskette 1". The new system used a soft sector recording format that stored nearly 250 kB on a disk. Drives supporting this format were offered by a number of manufacturers and soon became common for moving smaller amounts of data. This disk format became known as the Single Sided Single Density or SSSD format. It was designed to hold the same amount of data as 3000 punch cards.

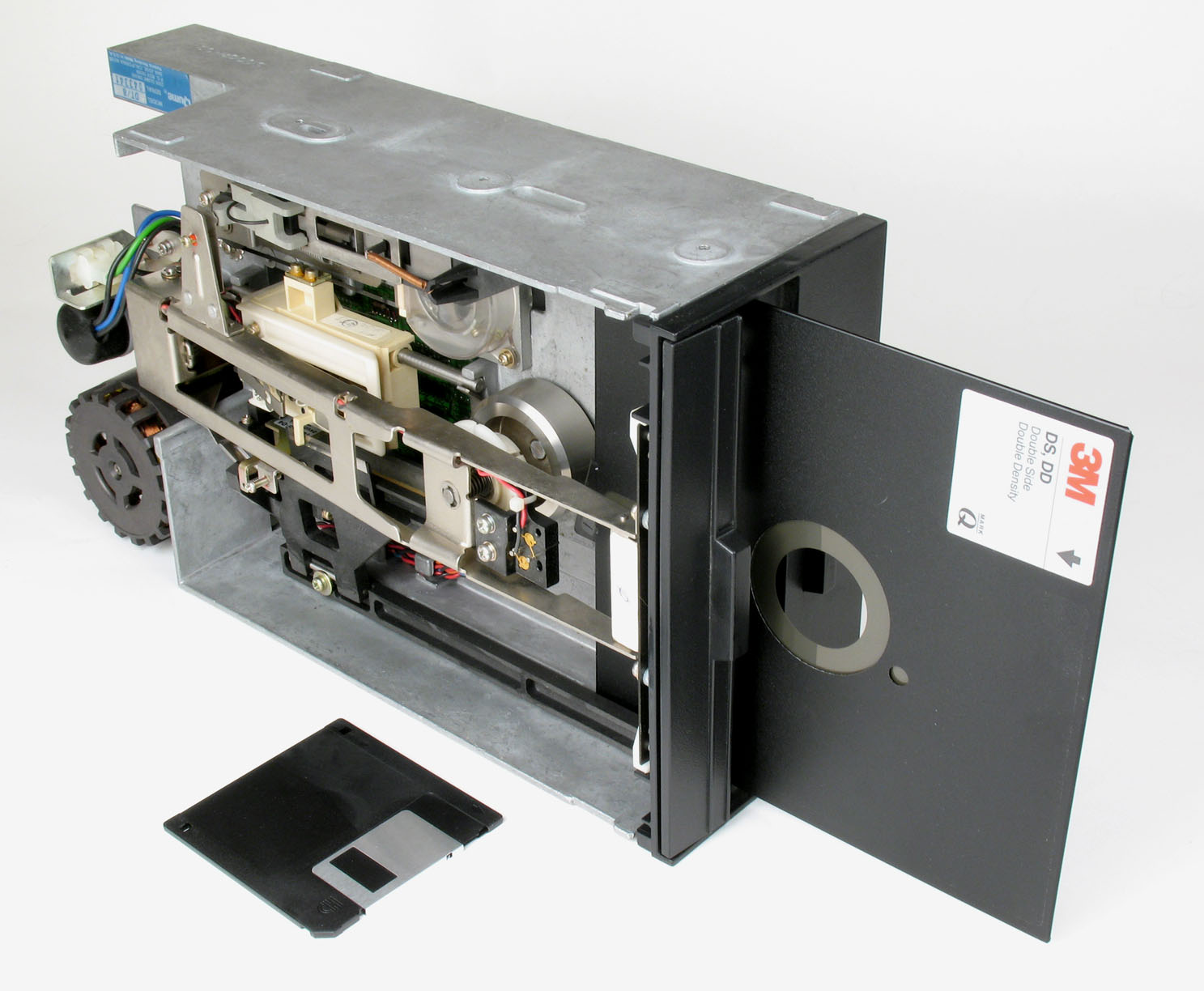
8-inch disk drive with diskette; 3½-inch disk for comparison.

In 1973, Shugart founded Shugart Associates which went on to become the dominant manufacturer of 8-inch (203 mm) floppy disk drives. Its SA800 became the industry standard for form factor and interface.

In 1976, media supplier Information Terminals Corporation enhanced resilience further by adding a Teflon coating to the magnetic disk itself.

When the first microcomputers were being developed in the 1970s, the 8-inch floppy found a place as one of the few "high speed, mass storage" devices that were even remotely affordable to the target market (individuals and small businesses). The first microcomputer operating system, CP/M, originally shipped on 8-inch disks. However, the drives were still expensive, typically costing more than the computer they were attached to, so most machines of the era used cassette tape instead.

In 1976, IBM introduced the 500 KB Double Sided Single Density (DSSD) format, and in 1977 IBM introduced the 1–1.2 MB Double Sided Double Density (DSDD) format.

Other 8-inch floppy disk formats such as the Burroughs unit failed to achieve any market presence.

At the end of 1978 the typical floppy disk price per piece was $5 (equivalent to $25 in 2025) to $8 (equivalent to $39 in 2025). Sales in 1978 for all types of drives and media were expected to reach $135 million for media and $875 million for drives.

The 8-inch floppy disk drive interface standard as developed from the Shugart Associates drives involved a 50-pin interface and a spindle motor that ran directly from the A/C line and spun constantly. Other later models used a DC motor with corresponding changes to the interface to start and stop the motor.

== 5¼-inch minifloppy ==
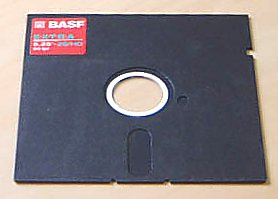
A double-density 5¼-inch disk with a partly exposed magnetic medium spun about a central hub. The cover has a cloth liner to brush dust from the medium. Note the “write-enable slot” to the upper right and the hole next to the hub that gives access to the index hole in the disk.

In a 1976 meeting, An Wang of Wang Laboratories informed Jim Adkisson and Don Massaro of Shugart Associates that the 8-inch format was simply too large and expensive for the desktop word processing machines he was developing at the time, and argued for a US$100 drive (equivalent to $570 in 2025).

According to Massaro, Adkisson proposed a smaller size and began working with cardboard mockups before the Wang meeting. George Sollman suggests the size was the average of existing tape drives of the era. It is an urban legend that the physical size came about when they met with Wang at a bar in Boston, and that when asked what size would be appropriate, Wang pointed to a cocktail napkin—there was no such meeting.

The new drive of this size stored 98.5 kB, later increased to 110 kB by adding five tracks. The 5¼-inch drive was considerably less expensive than the 8-inch drive, and started appearing on CP/M machines.

Shugart's initial 5¼-inch drive was the 35-track, single-sided SA-400, which was widely used in many early microcomputers, and which introduced the 34-pin interface that would become an industry standard. It could be used with either a hard or soft sector controller, and storage capacity was listed as 90 kB (single density) or 113 kB (double density). The drive went on sale in late 1976 at a list price of $400, with a box of ten disks at $60. The new, smaller disk format was popular, and by 1978 ten different manufacturers were producing 5¼-inch drives. At one point, Shugart was producing 4,000 drives a day, but their ascendancy was short-lived; the company's fortunes declined in the early 1980s. Part of this was due to their failure to develop a reliable 80-track drive, increasing competition, and the loss of several lucrative contracts. Apple by 1982 had switched to using cheaper Alps drive mechanisms in their computers, and IBM chose Tandon as their sole supplier of disk drives for the PC. By 1977 Shugart had been purchased by Xerox, who closed the operations in 1985 and sold the brand to a third party.

In 1978, I.T.C. (later called Verbatim), had approximately 35 percent of the estimated $135 million floppy disk market and sold 5¼-inch disks in large quantities for $1.50 each (equivalent to $7 in 2025).

Apple purchased bare Shugart SA400 drive mechanisms for their Disk II drive, which was then equipped with a custom Apple controller board and the faceplate stamped with the Apple logo. Steve Wozniak developed a recording scheme known as Group Coded Recording which allowed 140 kB of storage, well above the standard single-density 90 kB, although the price of 113 kB double density controllers fell not long after the Disk II's introduction. GCR recording used software to detect the track and sector being accessed, hence there was no need for hard sector disks or even the index hole.

Commodore also elected to use GCR recording (although a different variation not compatible with Apple's format) in their disk drive line. Tandy, however, used industry-standard FM on the TRS-80's disk drives, with stock Shugart SA400 drives, and so had a mere 85 kB of storage.

These early drives read only one side of the disk, leading to the popular budget approach of cutting a second write-enable slot and index hole into the carrier envelope and flipping it over (thus, the “flippy disk”) to use the other side for additional storage. This was considered risky by some as single sided disks were only certified by the manufacturer for single-sided use. The reasoning was that, when flipped, the disk would spin in the opposite direction inside its cover, so some of the dirt that had been collected by the fabric lining in the previous rotations would be picked up by the disk and dragged past the read/write head.

Although hard sectored disks were used on some early 8-inch drives prior to the IBM 33FD (May 1973), they were never widely used in 5¼-inch form, although North Star clung to the format until they went bankrupt in 1984.

Tandon introduced a double-sided drive in 1978, doubling the capacity, and this new “double sided double density” (DSDD) format increased capacity to 360 KB. (Note: 48 tpi DSDD comprising 2 sides × 40 tracks/side × 9 sectors/track × 512 bytes/sector = 368.64 kByte or 360 kB, see "Tandon Model TM-100 Mini-Floppy Disk Drives" (PDF). January 1980. Archived (PDF) from the original on 2019-09-23. Other formats with higher or lower capacities existed.)

By 1979, there were also 77-track 5¼-inch drives available, mostly used in CP/M and other professional computers, and also found in some of Commodore's disk drive line.

By the early 1980s, falling prices of computer hardware and technological advances led to the near-universal adoption of soft sector, double density disk formats. In addition, more compact half-height disk drives began to appear, as well as double-sided drives, although the cost meant that single-sided remained the standard for most home computers, and 80-track drives known as "quad density".

For most of the 1970s and 1980s, the floppy drive was the primary storage device for word processors and microcomputers. Since these machines had no hard drive, the OS was usually booted from one floppy disk, which was then removed and replaced by another one containing the application. Some machines using two disk drives (or one dual drive) allowed the user to leave the OS disk in place and simply change the application disks as needed, or to copy data from one floppy to another. In the early 1980s, “quad density” 96-track-per-inch drives appeared, increasing the capacity to 720 kB. RX50 was another proprietary format, used by Digital Equipment Corporation's Rainbow 100, DECmate II, and Professional 300 Series. It held 400 kB (Note: 80 × 1 tracks × 10 blocks/track × 512 bytes) on a single side by using 96 tracks per inch and cramming 10 sectors per track.

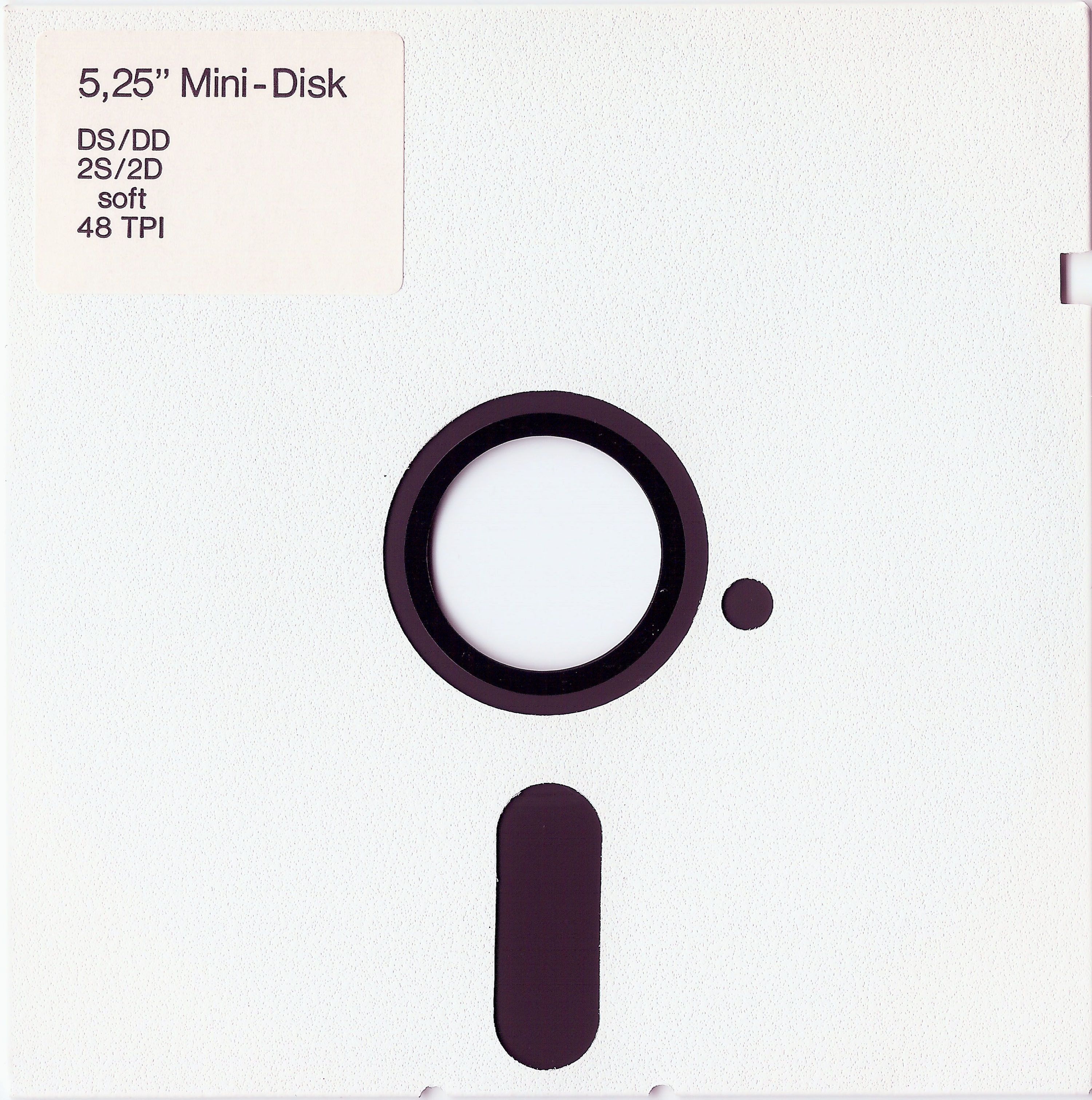
White 5¼-inch floppy disk

Floppy disks were supported on IBM PC DOS and MS-DOS from their beginning on the original IBM PC. With version 1.0 of PC DOS (1981), only single-sided 160 kB floppies were supported. Version 1.1 the next year saw support expand to double-sided 320 kB disks. Finally, in 1983, DOS 2.0 supported 9 sectors per track rather than 8, providing 180 kB on a (formatted) single-sided disk and 360 kB on a double-sided.

=== High-density version ===
In 1984, IBM introduced the "5¼-inch" high density disk format with its new IBM AT machines. The diameter is actually 130 mm (5.12 in). The 5¼ HD drive was essentially a scaled-down 8-inch drive, using the same rotation speed and bit rate, it provided over three times as much storage as the 360 kB format, but had compatibility issues with the older drives due to the narrower read/write head.

Except for labelling, 5¼-inch high-density disks were externally identical to their double-density counterparts. This led to an odd situation wherein the drive itself was unable to determine the density of the disk inserted except by reading the disk media to determine the format. It was therefore possible to use a high-density drive to format a double-density disk to the higher capacity. This usually appeared to work (sometimes reporting a small number of bad sectors)—at least for a time. The problem was that the high-density format was made possible by the creation of a new high-coercivity oxide coating (after soft sector formatting became standard, previous increases in density were largely enabled by improvements in head technology; up until that point, the media formulation had essentially remained the same since 1976). In order to format or write to this high-coercivity media, the high-density drive switched its heads into a mode using a stronger magnetic field. When these stronger fields were written onto a double-density disk (having lower coercivity media), the strongly magnetized oxide particles would begin to affect the magnetic charge of adjacent particles. The net effect is that the disk would begin to erase itself. On the other hand, the opposite procedure (attempting to format an HD disk as DD) would fail almost every time, as the high-coercivity media would not retain data written by the low-power DD field. High-density 3½-inch disks avoided this problem by the addition of a hole in the disk cartridge so that the drive could determine the appropriate density. However, the coercivity rating between the 3.5-inch DD and HD formats, 665 and 720 oersteds, is much narrower than that for the 5¼-inch format, 600 versus 300 oersteds, and consequently it was possible to format a 3.5-inch DD disk as HD with no apparent problems.

By the end of the 1980s, 5¼-inch disk drives and disks were still available, but had been mostly superseded by the 3.5-inch disks. By the mid-1990s, the drives had virtually disappeared as the 3.5-inch disk became the predominant floppy disk.

== Also-rans ==
=== Twiggy ===
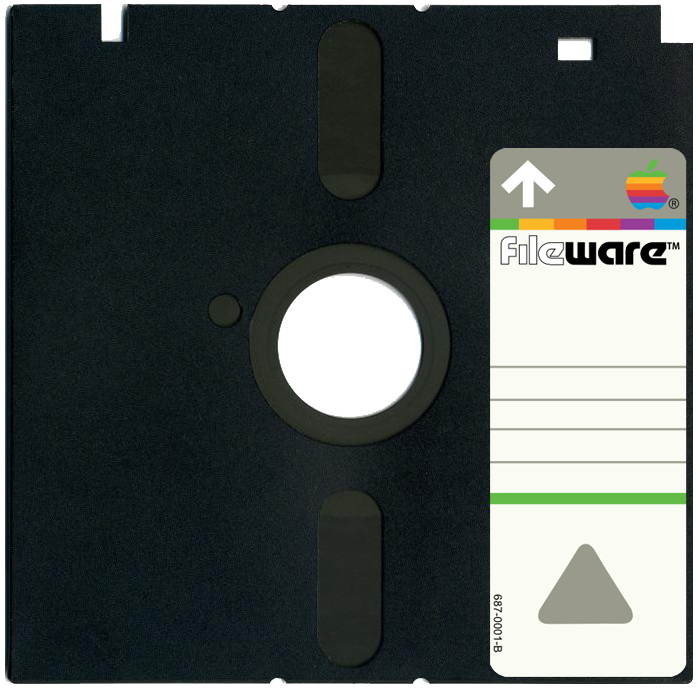
FileWare diskette

During the development of the Apple Lisa, Apple developed a disk format codenamed Twiggy and officially known as FileWare. While basically similar to a standard 5¼-inch disk, the Twiggy disk had an additional set of write windows on the top of the disk with the label running down the side. The drive was also present in prototypes of the original Apple Macintosh computer, but was removed in both the Mac and later versions of the Lisa in favor of the 3½-inch floppy disk from Sony. The drives were notoriously unreliable, and Apple was criticized for needlessly diverging from industry standards.

=== Microfloppy format war ===
Throughout the early 1980s, the limitations of the 5¼-inch format were starting to become clear. Originally designed to be smaller and more practical than the 8-inch format, the 5¼-inch system was itself too large, and as the quality of the recording media grew, the same amount of data could be placed on a smaller surface. Another problem was that the 5¼-inch disks were simply scaled down versions of the 8-inch disks, which had never really been engineered for ease of use. The thin folded-plastic shell allowed the disk to be easily damaged through bending and allowed dirt to get onto the disk surface through the opening.

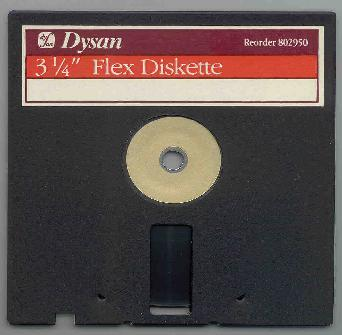
A 3½-inch floppy disk

A number of solutions were developed, with drives at 2-inches (50 mm), 2 1/2 inches (64 mm), 3 inches (76 mm) and 3 1/2 inches (89 mm), all being offered by various companies, leading to a format war. These formats all shared a number of advantages over the older format, including a small form factor and a rigid case with a slideable write protect catch. The almost-universal use of the 5¼-inch format made it very difficult for any of these new formats to gain any significant market share. Some of these formats included Dysan and Shugart's 3 1/4-inch (83 mm) floppy disk, the later ubiquitous Sony 3½-inch disk and the 3-inch format:

- the 3-inch BRG MCD-1 developed in 1973 by Marcell Jánosi, a Hungarian inventor of Budapest Radiotechnic Company (Budapesti Rádiótechnikai Gyár).
- the Amdek AmDisk-3 Micro-Floppy-disk cartridge system in December 1982, which was originally designed for use with the Apple II Disk II interface card
- the Mitsumi Quick Disk 3-inch floppies.

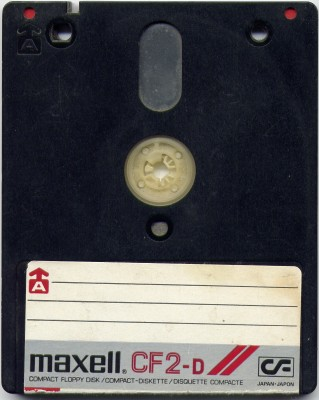
The CF has a harder casing than a 3½-inch floppy; the metal door is opened by a sliding plastic tab on the right side.

The 3-inch floppy drive itself was manufactured by Hitachi, Matsushita and Maxell. Only Teac outside this "network" is known to have produced drives. Similarly, only three manufacturers of media (Maxell, Matsushita and Tatung) are known (sometimes also branded Yamaha, Amsoft, Panasonic, Schneider, Tandy, Godexco and Dixons), but "no-name" disks with questionable quality have been seen in circulation.

Amstrad included a 3-inch single-sided, double-density (180 kB) drive in their CPC and some models of PCW. The PCW 8512 included a double-sided, quad-density (720 kB) drive as the second drive, and later models, such as the PCW 9512, used quad-density even for the first drive. The single-sided double density (180 kB) drive was "inherited" by the ZX Spectrum +3 computer after Amstrad bought the rights from Sinclair. The Oric-1 and Atmos systems from Oric International also used the 3-inch floppy drives, originally shipping with the Atmos, but also supported on the older Oric-1.

Since all 3-inch media were double-sided in nature, single-sided drive owners were able to flip the disk over to use the other side. The sides were termed "A" and "B" and were completely independent, but single-sided drive units could only access the upper side at one time.

The disk format itself had no more capacity than the more popular (and cheaper) 5¼-inch floppies. Each side of a double-density disk held 180 kB for a total of 360 kB per disk, and 720 kB for quad-density disks. Unlike 5¼-inch or 3½-inch disks, the 3-inch disks were designed to be reversible and sported two independent write-protect switches. It was also more reliable thanks to its hard casing.

3-inch drives were also used on a number of exotic and obscure CP/M systems such as the Tatung Einstein and occasionally on MSX systems in some regions. Other computers to have used this format are the more unknown Gavilan Mobile Computer and Matsushita's National Mybrain 3000. The Yamaha MDR-1 also used 3-inch drives.

The main problems with this format were the high price, due to the quite elaborate and complex case mechanisms. However, the final tip of the scale was when Sony in 1984 convinced Apple Computer to use the 3½-inch drives in the Macintosh 128K model, effectively making this size drive a de facto standard.

==== Mitsumi Quick Disk ====
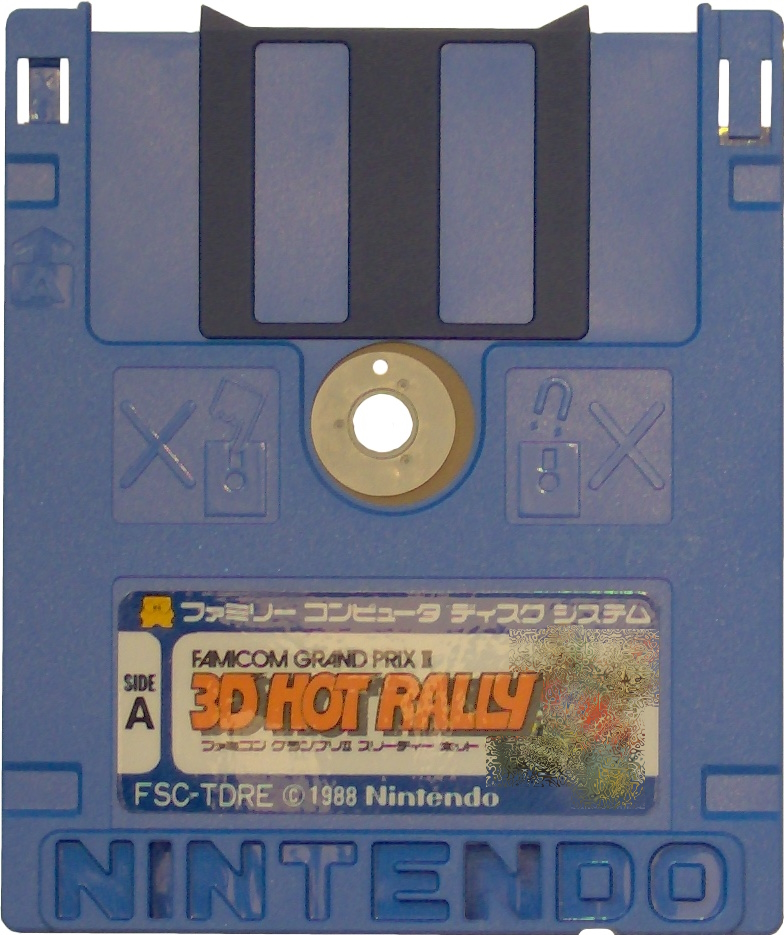
Quick Disk for Famicom Disk System

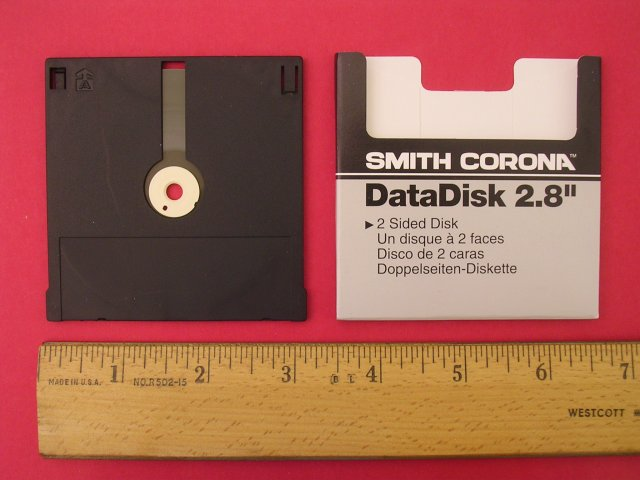
A Smith Corona 2.8-inch DataDisk

A near 3-inch format was Mitsumi's Quick Disk format, originally released for the MSX computer in 1984. The Quick Disk format is referred to in various size references: 2.8 inches (71 mm), 3 inches (76 mm) and 3 by 4 inches (76 mm × 102 mm). Mitsumi offered this as OEM equipment, expecting their VAR customers to customize the packaging for their own particular use; disks thus vary in storage capacity and casing size. The Quick Disk uses a 2.8-inch magnetic media, break-off write-protection tabs (one for each side), and contains a see-through hole near the center spindle (used to ensure spindle clamping). Nintendo packaged the 2.8-inch magnetic media in a 3×4-inch housing, while others packaged the same media in a 3-inch square housing.

The Quick Disk's most successful use was in Nintendo's Famicom Disk System (FDS). The FDS package of Mitsumi's Quick Disk used a 3×4-inch plastic housing called the "Disk Card". Most FDS disks did not have cover protection to prevent media contamination, but a later special series of five games did include a protective shutter.

Mitsumi's "3-inch" Quick Disk media were also used in a 3 by 3 inches (76 mm × 76 mm) housing for many Smith Corona word processors. The Smith Corona disks are confusingly labelled "DataDisk 2.8 inches", presumably referring to the size of the medium inside the hard plastic case.

The Quick Disk was also used in several MIDI keyboards and MIDI samplers of the mid-1980s. A non-exhaustive list includes: the Roland S-10, Roland S-220, and MKS100 samplers, the Korg SQD1, the Korg SQD8 MIDI sequencer, Akai's 1985 model MD280 drive for the S-612 MIDI sampler, Akai's X7000 / S700 (rack version) and X3700, and the Yamaha MDF1 MIDI disk drive (intended for their DX7/21/100/TX7 synthesizers, RX11/21/21L drum machines, and QX1, QX21 and QX5 MIDI sequencers).

As the cost in the 1980s to add 5¼-inch drives was still quite high, the Mitsumi Quick Disk was competing as a lower cost alternative packaged in several now obscure 8-bit computer systems. Another non-inclusive list of Quick Disk versions: QDM-01, QDD (Quick Disk Drive) on French Thomson micro-computers, in the Casio QD-7 drive, in a peripheral for the Sharp MZ-700 & MZ-800 system, in the DPQ-280 Quickdisk for the Daewoo/Dynadata MSX1 DPC-200, in the Dragon 32/64 machine, in the Crescent Quick Disk 128, 128i and 256 peripherals for the ZX Spectrum, and in the Triton Quick Disk peripheral also for the ZX Spectrum.

The World of Spectrum FAQ reveals that the drives did come in different sizes: 128 to 256 kB in Crescent's incarnation, and in the Triton system, with a density of 4410 bits per inch, data transmission rate of 101.6 kbit/s, a 2.8-inch (71 mm) double sided disk type and a capacity of up to 20 sectors per side at 2.5 kB per sector, up to 100 kB per disk. Quick Disk as used in the Famicom Disk System holds 64 kB of data per side, requiring a manual turn-over to access the second side.

Unusually, the Quick Disk utilizes "a continuous linear tracking of the head and thus creates a single spiral track along the disk similar to a record groove." This has led some to compare it more to a "tape-stream" unit than typically what is thought of as a random-access disk drive.

== 3½-inch microfloppy ==
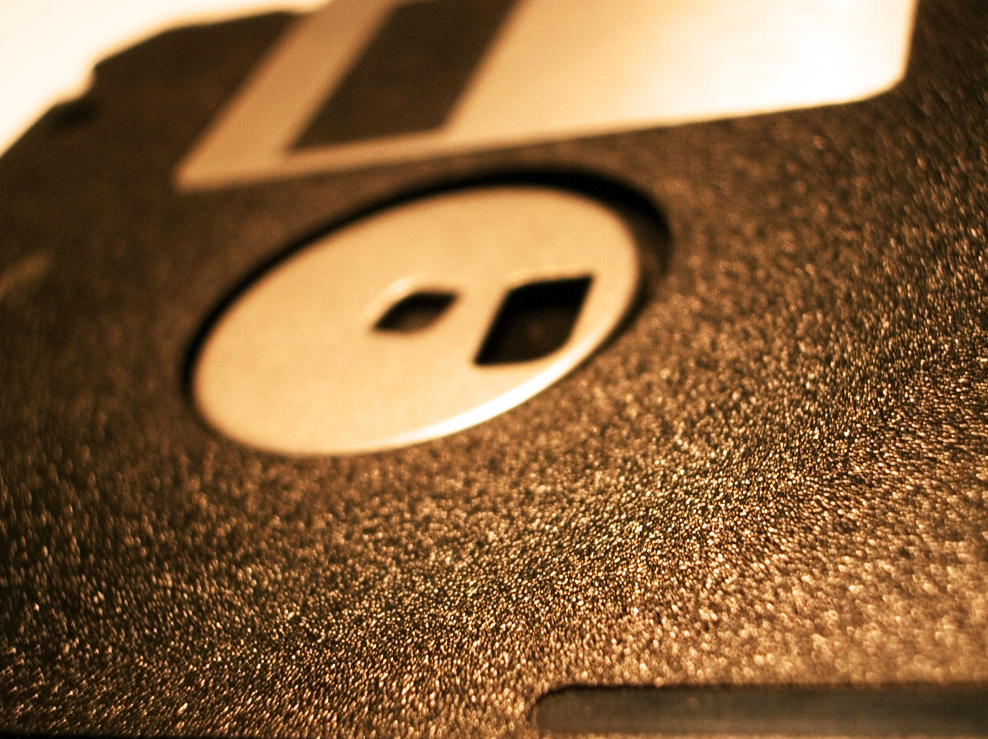
Close-up of 3½-inch disk

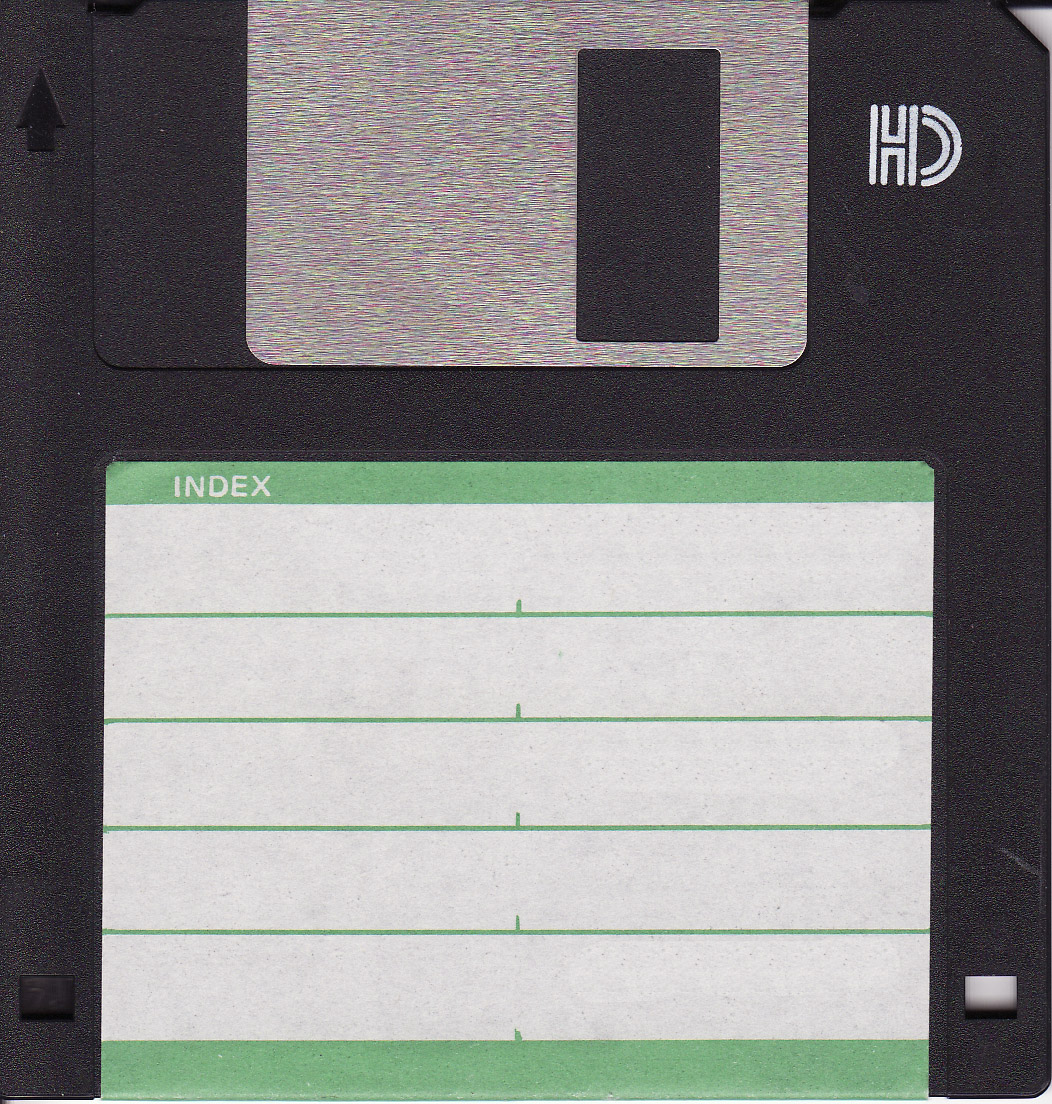
Standard 3½-inch disk with a blank label

In 1981, Sony introduced their "3½-inch" floppy disk cartridge (90.0 mm × 94.0 mm) having a single sided unformatted capacity of 218.8 kB and a formatted capacity of 161.2 kB. A double sided version was available in 1982. This initial Sony design was similar to other less-than-5¼-inch designs but somewhat simpler in construction. Sony's SMC-70 of 1982 is often cited as the first computer to use this format and hence a 3.33 in (85 mm) floppy disk, but the drive first shipped in the Sony OA-S3300 word processor announced in 1980 and released in 1981, with the more obscure Jonos Courier being first portable computer to ship Sony's new technology. Besides adoption by Hewlett-Packard's HP-150 of 1983 and Sony's MSX computers that year, this initial design of a 3.33-inch format might have suffered from a similar fate as the other new formats; the 5¼-inch format simply had too much market share.

However, in May 1982 the Microfloppy Industry Committee (MIC) was formed, eventually growing to a consortium of 23 system, drive and media manufacturers. In January 1983 they agreed with Sony on a 3½-inch drive and media specification based upon the original Sony design, but with the same speed and interface as then-standard 5¼-inch drives.

=== Adoption ===
The first single-sided 3½-inch drives compatible with the MIC committee's new media specification shipped in early 1983, followed immediately in 1984 by double-sided compatible versions. In 1984, Apple Computer selected the format for their new Macintosh computers. Then, in 1985, Atari adopted it for their new ST line, and Commodore for their new Amiga and, two years later, their existing 8-bit line of computers. In 1986, DOS added 3½-inch support, and IBM released their first computer with 3½-inch floppy drives, the IBM PC Convertible. By 1988, the 3½-inch was outselling the 5¼-inch.

=== Nomenclature ===
In South Africa, the 3½-inch format was generally called a stiffy disk, to better distinguish it from the outwardly flexible 5¼-inch format. (Both formats contain a flexible medium —the literal floppy disk— but while the 5¼-inch format's carrier envelope is also somewhat flexible if not floppy, the 3½-inch format's hard plastic carrier envelope is significantly more rigid.)

The term "3 1/2-inch" or "3.5-inch" disk is and was rounded from the 90 mm actual dimension of one side of the rectangular cartridge. The actual disk diameter is 85.8 mm (3.38 in).

=== Characteristics ===
The 3½-inch disks had, by way of their rigid case's slide-in-place metal cover, the significant advantage of being much better protected against unintended physical contact with the disk surface than 5¼-inch disks when the disk was handled outside the disk drive. When the disk was inserted, a part inside the drive moved the metal cover aside, giving the drive's read/write heads the necessary access to the magnetic recording surfaces. Adding the slide mechanism resulted in a slight departure from the previous square outline. The irregular, rectangular shape had the additional merit that it made it impossible to insert the disk sideways by mistake as had indeed been possible with earlier formats.

3½-inch drives included several other advantages over the older drive types, including not requiring a terminating resistor pack, and no need of an index hole.

The shutter mechanism was not without its problems, however. On old or roughly treated disks, the shutter could bend away from the disk. This made it vulnerable to being ripped off completely (which does not damage the disk itself but does leave it much more vulnerable to dust), or worse, catching inside a drive and possibly either getting stuck inside or damaging the drive.

=== Evolution ===
Like the 5¼-inch, the 3½-inch disk underwent an evolution of its own. When Apple introduced the Macintosh in 1984, it used single-sided 3½-inch disk drives with an advertised capacity of 400 kB. The encoding technique used by these drives was known as GCR, or Group Coded Recording (similar recording methods were used by Commodore on its 5¼-inch drives and Sirius Systems Technology in its Victor 9000 non-PC-compatible MS-DOS machine).

Higher capacities

Somewhat later, PC-compatible machines began using single-sided 3½-inch disks with an advertised capacity of 360 kB (the same as a double-sided 5¼-inch disk), and a different, incompatible recording format called MFM (Modified Frequency Modulation). GCR and MFM drives (and their formatted disks) were incompatible, although the physical disks were the same. In 1986, Apple introduced double-sided, 800 kB disks, still using GCR, and soon after, IBM began using 720 kB double-sided double-density MFM disks in PCs like the IBM PC Convertible. IBM PC compatibles adopted it too, while the Amiga used MFM encoding on the same disks to give a capacity of 1 MB (880 kB available once formatted).

HD

An MFM-based, "high-density" format, displayed as "HD" on the disks themselves and typically advertised as "1.44 MB" was introduced in 1987; the most common formatted capacity was 1,474,560 bytes (or 1440 KiB), double that of the 720 kiB variant. (Note: i.e. IBM's format of 512 bytes/sector * 80 sectors/track * 18 tracks/side * 2 sides/disk = 1,474,560 bytes per disk. Other formats could have somewhat more or less capacity available.) The term "1.44 MB" is a misnomer caused by dividing the size of 1440 kibibytes (1440 * 1024 bytes) by 1000, thus converting 1440 KiB to "1.44 MB" - where the MB stands for neither a megabyte (1,000,000 bytes) nor a mebibyte (1,048,576 bytes) but instead 1,024,000 bytes. Correctly dividing 1440 KiB by 1024 gives a size of 1.40625 MiB. These HD disks had an extra hole in the case on the opposite side of the write-protect notch. IBM used this format on their PS/2 series introduced in 1987. Apple started using "HD" in 1988, on the Macintosh IIx, and the HD floppy drive soon became universal on virtually all Macintosh and PC hardware. Apple's FDHD (Floppy Disk High Density) drive was capable of reading and writing both GCR and MFM formatted disks, and thus made it relatively easy to exchange files with PC users. Apple later marketed this drive as the SuperDrive. Amiga included "HD" floppy drives relatively late, with releasing of Amiga 4000 in 1992, and was able to store 1760 KB on it, with ability in software to read/write PC's 1440 kB/720 kB formats.

ED

Another advance in the oxide coatings allowed for a new "extra-high density" ("ED") format at 2880 kB introduced in 1990 on the NeXTcube, NeXTstation and IBM PS/2 Model 57. However, by this time the increased capacity was too small an advance over the HD format and it never became widely used.

== See also ==
- Floppy disk variants
- History of hard disk drives
- History of IBM magnetic disk drives
- List of floppy disk formats
