= Sony SMC-70 =

Microcomputer released in 1982

SMC-70
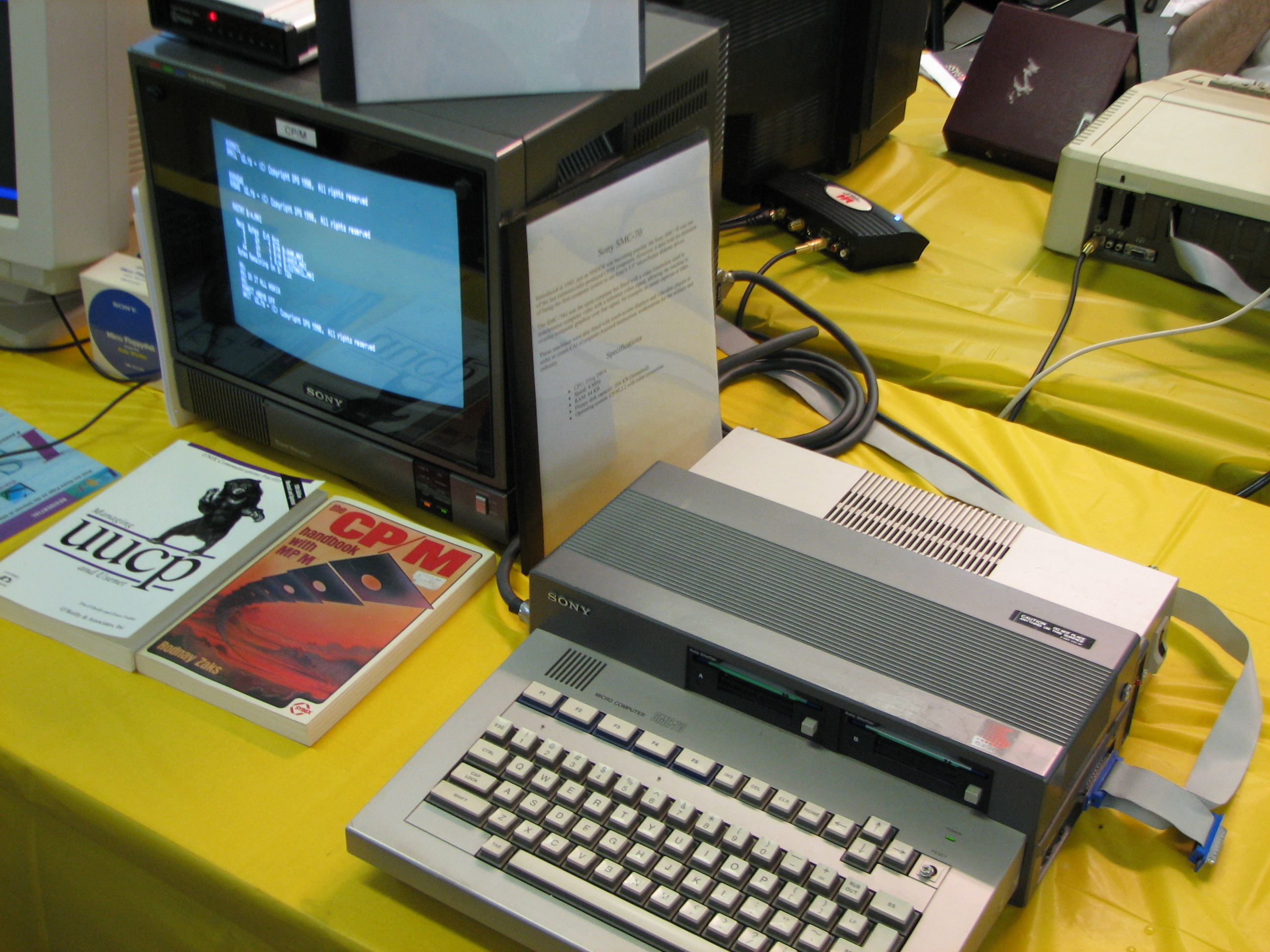
- Sony SMC-70 Micro Computer at the Vintage Computer Festival (VCF) East 6.0, at the InfoAge Science Center
- Released: September 1982; 44 years ago
- Operating system: CP/M 2.2 with custom color extensions, Sony BASIC language interpreter in ROM
- CPU: Sharp Z-80A @ 4.028 MHz
- Memory: 64 KB RAM
- Storage: Cassette port 1200 bps, 4x optional 3.5" micro floppy disk drive, optional 8" floppy disk drive, optional hard disk drive
- Display: Analog RGB & B/W composite video output: 40 × 25, 80 × 25 (8 × 8 dot matrix) monochrome (any two of 16 colors) text modes; 160 × 100 16 colors (4 pages), 320 × 200 16 colors, 640 × 200 4 colors, or 640 × 400 in monochrome graphic modes, 16 border colors
- Graphics: HD46505S-1 CRT controller
- Sound: 1 voice, 5 octave sounds
- Input: Full-stroke keyboard, 72 keys with editing and arrow keys
- Connectivity: RS-232C, Tape, Light Pen, Key Pad, Audio output, RGB Multi Out, B/W Multi Out, I/O Expansion connector, parallel printer.
- Power: Built-in power supply unit
- Dimensions: (Width) 366 mm × (height) 90 mm × (depth) 444 mm
- Weight: 4.8 kg
- Related: SMC-70G, SMC-70GP

The SMC-70 is a microcomputer that was produced by Sony and released in September 1982. (Note: It was announced earlier on May 17, 1982.) The system was initially released for general office use in the United States, with the SMC-70G and SMC-70GP (released in 1983) designed for professional video generation, for example in character generation applications and digital video effect generation. Sony also released the SMC-70K in Japan which had a different kana keyboard layout than the Japanese SMC-70.

== Specifications ==
The SMC-70 was the second Sony device that used Sony's recently invented 3.5" micro floppy disk drive (first introduced in 1980) that was modified to become the industry standard. (Note: Jonos, Ltd., of California, which had inked a deal with Sony in May 1982 worth roughly $1 million, released the Courier portable computer in June 1982, which was the first computer to market with Sony's 3.5" drives built-in.) Like many home and office computers of the era, it had its own specially developed version of BASIC called Sony BASIC, designed to take advantage of a color Sony Trinitron display developed by BUG. With optional expansion ROMs the system could display kanji characters.

The system was expandable, allowing users to install a disk controller with one or two internal 3.5" disk drives (the base system did not include a floppy disk controller or disk drives). The internal 3.5" floppy disk controller supported up to two additional 3.5" disk drives (for a total of four 3.5" drives) mounted in an external enclosure.

The base system included the following external ports: I/O expansion, black and white composite monitor, analog RGB monitor, parallel printer, light pen, cassette deck, number pad, headphone, and RS-232C.

The system could further be expanded by plug-in modules. The SMC-70 had three externally available expansion ports (the unit split apart in the middle and expanded to accommodate one, two, or three modules). Users were limited by the available power from the power supply (0.95A at 120V – 114 watts).

Released expansion modules included:

- 256 KB RAM cache disk
- 5.25 and 8-inch FDD control unit (Shugart interface)
- Battery backup (UPS)
- Chinese character ROM
- IEEE-488 interface
- Kanji ROM
- NTSC superimposer (occupied two expansion slots)
- PAL superimposer
- RGB superimposer
- RS-232C serial interface (non-programmable)
- RS-232C serial interface (programmable)

Third parties also released expansion modules for the system. Third party expansions included a joystick port and a hard drive controller.

The external I/O expansion port supported a self-powered enclosure that held an additional five modules, the Videotizer (a device that converted analog images to a digital format that could be manipulated), or the 16-bit Supercharger. Internally the SMC-70 had two I/O expansion bus connectors, one of which was used by the 3.5" floppy drive controller.

With the use of the SMC-7086 Supercharger one could add a 5 MHz Intel 8086 16-bit CPU. The Supercharger also supported the addition of an Intel 8087 numeric data processor, which provided about 100 times the performance of the 8086 alone for numeric processing. The Supercharger came with a base 256 KB of RAM that was upgradable to a total of 768K via 256K expansion boards. With the Supercharger the SMC-70 could run CP/M-86. Though Sony announced the add-on would run MS-DOS 2.11, the OS was never released outside of Sony.

== Other models ==
The SMC-70G contains additional hardware to support video production, contains a higher wattage power supply (1.3A at 120V – 156 watts), an additional externally available expansion port (a total of four) on the expansion bus, two additional internal I/O expansion ports (used by the genlocking hardware), and an NTSC video genlocker. The SMC-70GP has a PAL video genlocker. The system interfaced with video devices (e.g. laserdisc player, videotape system) to mix computer generated graphics with live video.

== Technical specifications ==
Sony SMC-70 specifications:

- Sharp Z80A CPU, clocked at 4.028 MHz
- HD46505S-1 CRT controller: 16 colors at 320 × 200, 4 colors at 640 × 200, black and white at 640 × 400
- 32 KB VRAM, 2 KB character RAM, 2 KB attribute RAM and 2 KB programmable font (PCG) RAM
- 32 KB (shadow ROM), 9 KB system monitor, 22 KB Sony BASIC, 1 KB character font
- 25 pin 75-19200 baud rate RS-232C interface

== 3.5" disk drive ==
While the SMC-70 was Sony's first computer with a 3.5" disk drive compatible with single-sided double-density (SSDD) 3.5" disks, it was not the first Sony device to use the drives. In 1980, Sony announced the Series 35 word processor (OA-S3300) in the United States, which was the first product to use the technology when released in 1981.

The original 3.5" floppy disk (OM-D3310) created by Sony was not compatible with later 3.5" drives due to the coercivity of the media. The drives in the SMC-70 rotated the disk at 600 RPM (versus 300 RPM of contemporary drives), which greatly improved data transfer speeds. The original Sony disk (OM-D3310) also did not contain a spring-loaded auto shutter. The user was required to slide the protective metal sleeve on the disk to the side prior to inserting the disk into the drive. When removing the disk from the drive the metal shutter was manually slid to the right to protect the disk. The SSDD disks had an unformatted capacity of 437.5 KB (280 KB formatted) with 135 tracks per inch (70 tracks on the disk). The Sony disk drives had a transfer rate of 500 Kbps when used with DD media (250 Kbps with SD media).

When the SMC-70 was released in 1982, the disk drives (OA-D30V) were capable of reading both the Sony standard disks (OM-D3310) and the future Microfloppy Industry Committee standard (though only the first 70 tracks under Sony's release of CP/M 2.2). An updated disk drive was released (the OA-D31V) that had the capability of opening a spring-loaded disk shutter (these drives were labeled with "Auto Shutter" on the drive to alert the user that it was not necessary to open the disk shutter on disks with a spring-loaded shutter prior to inserting a disk). Sony released an updated floppy disk based on the new standards (OM-D3320) that is compatible with both the SMC-70 and contemporary computers.

Though the SMC-70 was never offered with a double-sided disk drive, later releases of CP/M for the SMC-70 (e.g. 2.0) added support for double sided drives (e.g. OA-D32W), along with 40 and 80 track 5.25" drives. Sony released three families of 26 pin 600 RPM drives, the OA-D30V, OA-D31V, and OA-D32V/W (80 track, single/double sided). Only the OA-D30V and OA-D31V (also called MFD-31V) could read the original 3.5" format due to differences in magnetic coercivity.

== Software ==
The system could run software designed for CP/M 2.2, though many companies released special Sony versions to support the color display (such as SuperCalc and VisiCalc).
