= Yamaha MDR-1 =

The Yamaha Music Disc Recorder MDR-1 was a floppy disk unit which could be attached to the FX/FS organs and digitally record and play back Electone and Clavinova performances.

Two models were produced:

- MDR-1A for the FX-1, and
- MDR-1B for the FX-10, FX-20, FS-20, FS-100, FS-30, FS-200, FS-50, FS-300, FS-70 and FS-500.

It used 3-inch compact floppy disks which could store 200 KB per side, at a maximum of nine programs.

It measured 190(W) x 273(D) x 109(H) mm and weighed 4.5 kg.

It was later followed by the MDR-10.
