= Electone =

Trademark used by Yamaha for its line of electronic organs

Electone is the trademark used for electronic organs produced by Yamaha. With the exception of the top end performance models, most Electones are based on the design of the spinet electronic organ. Current models are completely digital and contain a variety of sounds, effects, and accompaniments, on top of the ability to store programming data onto memory devices.

== History ==
After Hammond pioneered the electronic organ in the 1930s, other manufacturers began to market their own versions of the instrument. By the end of the 1950s, familiar brand names of home organs in addition to Hammond included Conn, Kimball, Lowrey, and others, while companies such as Allen and Rodgers manufactured large electronic organs designed for church and other public settings.

What would later become the Yamaha Electone emerged as a prototype concept in 1958, then named "E-T". The Electone series finally made its commercial debut in 1959 with the D-1, a home instrument. By 1980, with the market waning sharply, and some manufacturers ceasing production, the Electone line embraced digital technology. This allowed Electone's survival as the traditional home electronic organ market dried up. The product name "Electone", coined from the word "Electronic" and "Tone", would become so popular in Japan that in later years, it would become a way to refer to electronic organs in general in the country.

Electones built until 1983 were often similar in specifications to a small theatre organ, with a main flute group analogous to the Tibia Clausa, strings (usually at 8' and 4'), and multiple reeds at 16' and 8' pitches.

Starting with the D-3, Electones featured theatre organ-style color coding for the tone levers, which followed as: white for flutes and diapasons, red for reeds (brass and woodwinds), yellow for string voices (including piano and guitar), and green for percussion voices.

Unlike theatre organs however, the tone levers could be gradually made louder, similar to a drawbar organ, and had 4 click positions (one "off" position followed by 3 progressively loud "on" levels), although they could be adjusted between them.

By the 1980s, many of the most famous names had ceased home production, but the Electone had successfully transitioned into the modern world of digital synthesizers.

The FE, and FX lines introduced in 1983, marked a transition from Theater organ styled instruments, with push buttons being used for selecting sounds, instead of tone levers, which would be carried over to future models and lines afterwards.

It would come to compete with new products from Moog Music, Wersi, and later Kurzweil. Electones were to be found not only in homes, especially in Japan and elsewhere in the East Asia, but also in bands and other solo and group public performances.

== Notable former models ==
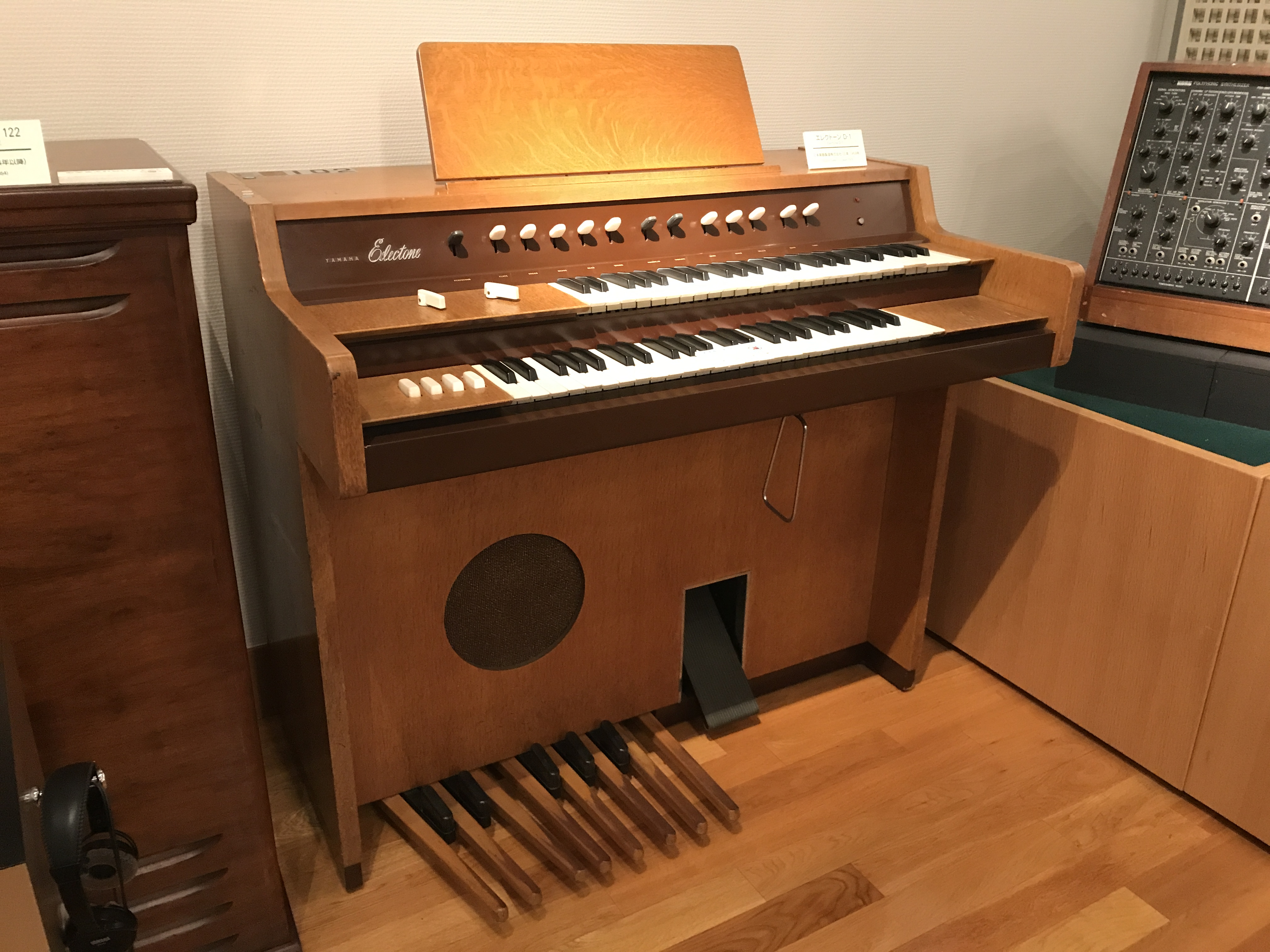
D-1 (1959) First Electone model from 1959

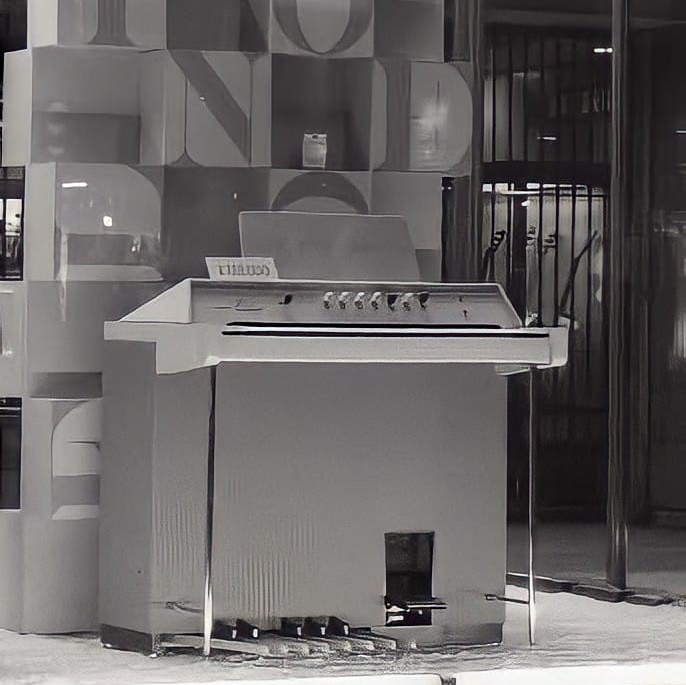
A-2 (1960) Electone model with single keyboard

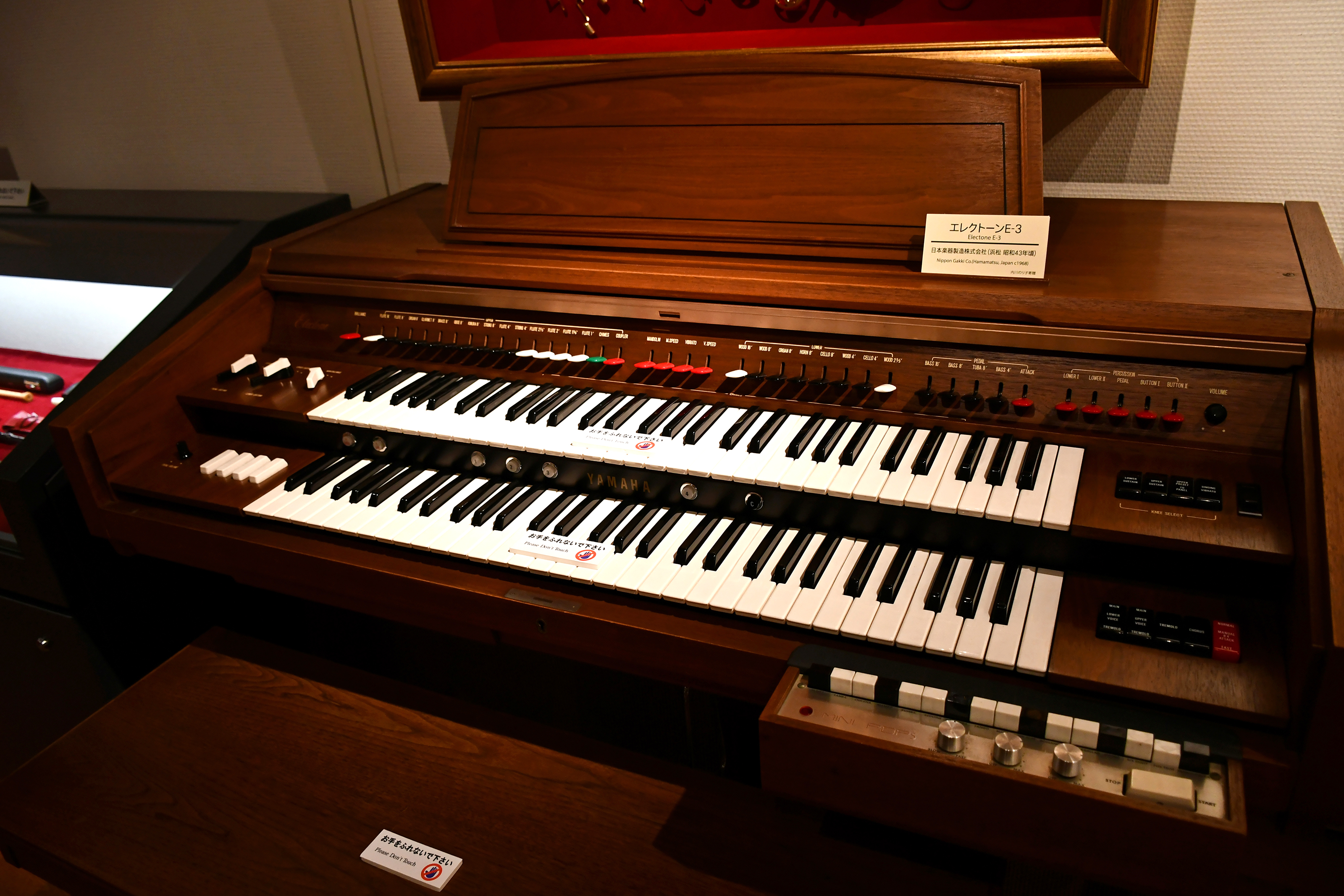
E-3 (1968) Firstly known as the first Electone stage model

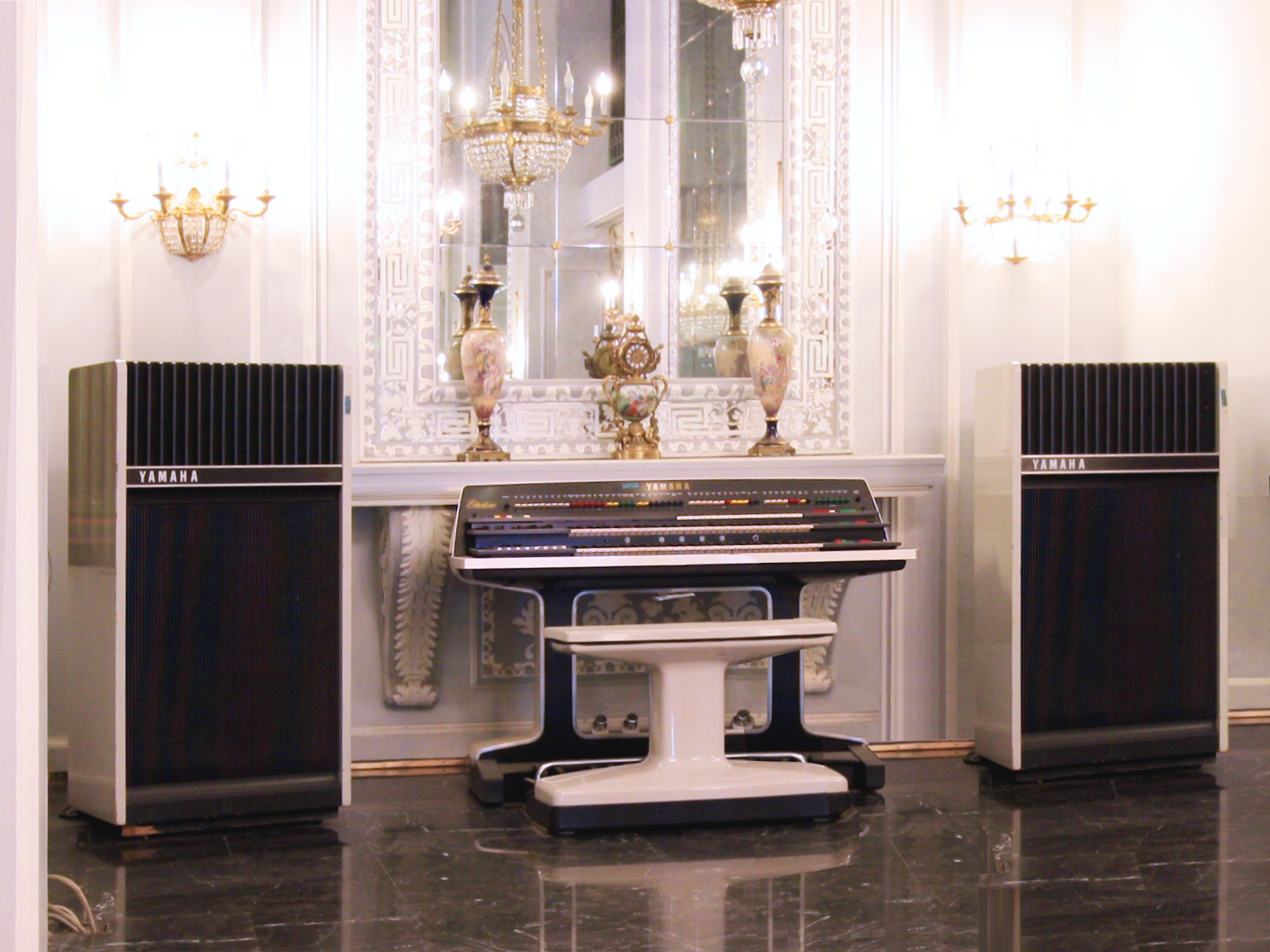
EX-42 (1970) First stage model with space-age design as Electone product

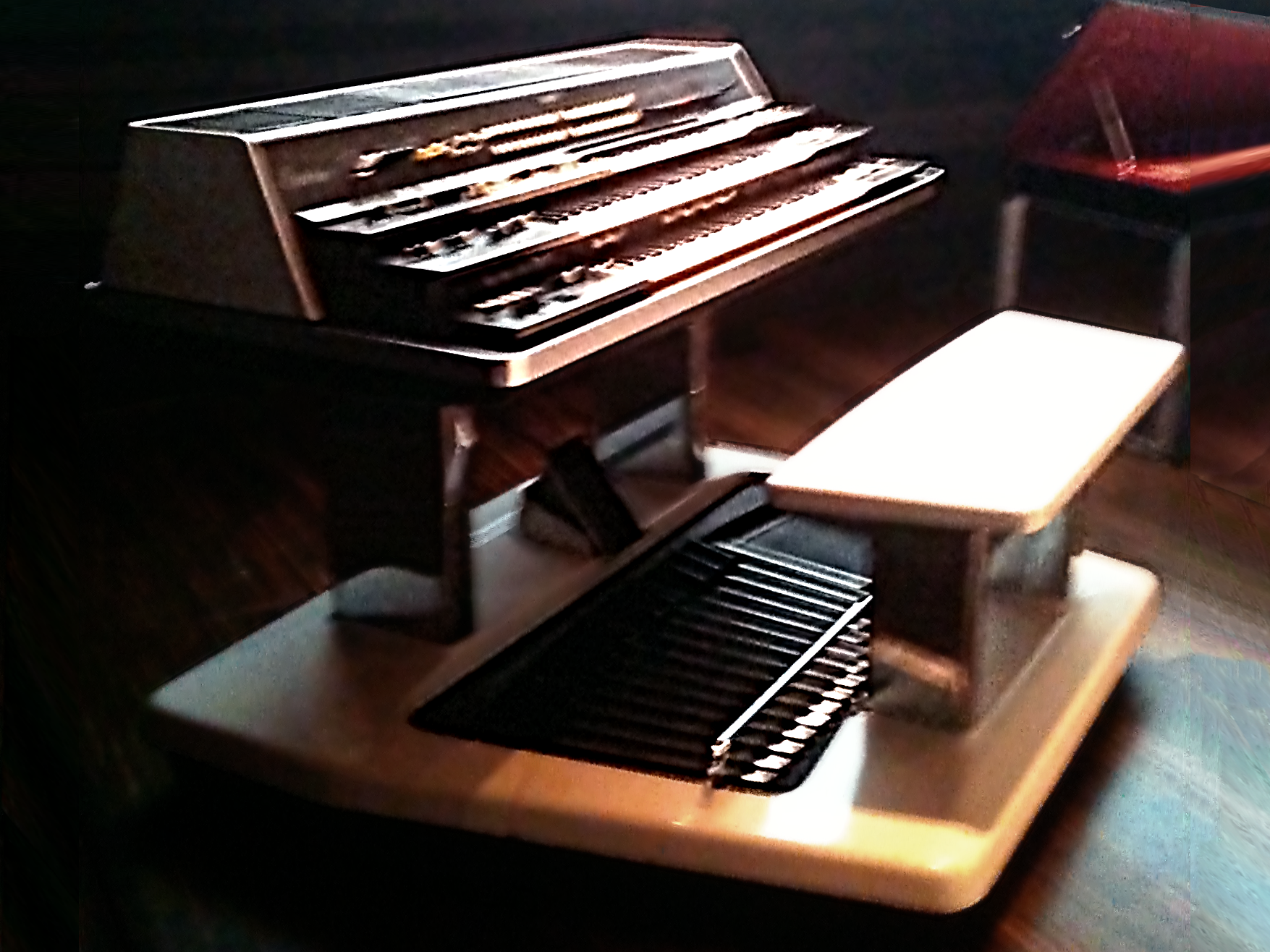
GX-1 (1975) First polyphonic synthesizer in Electone form

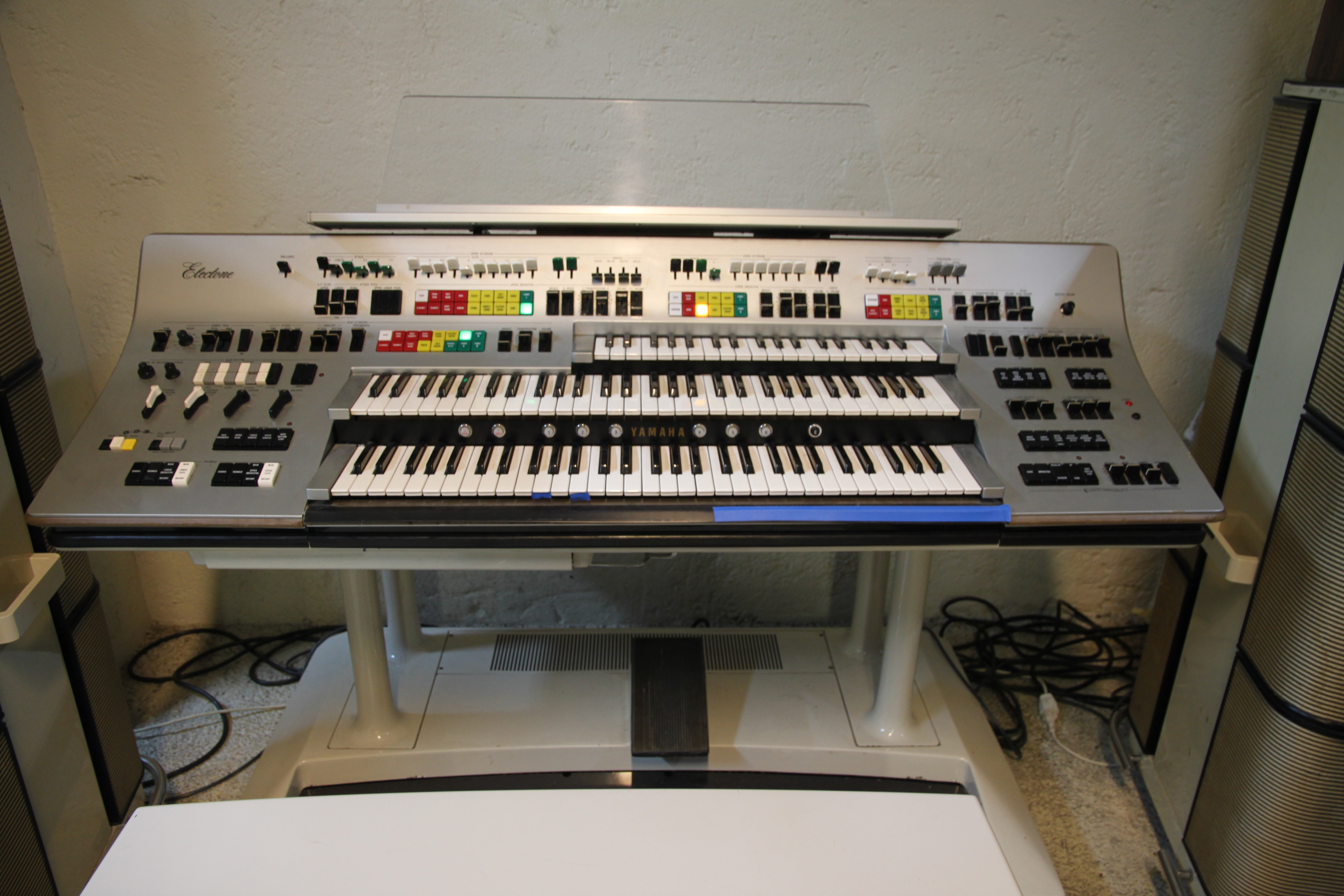
EX-1 (1977) Third stage model

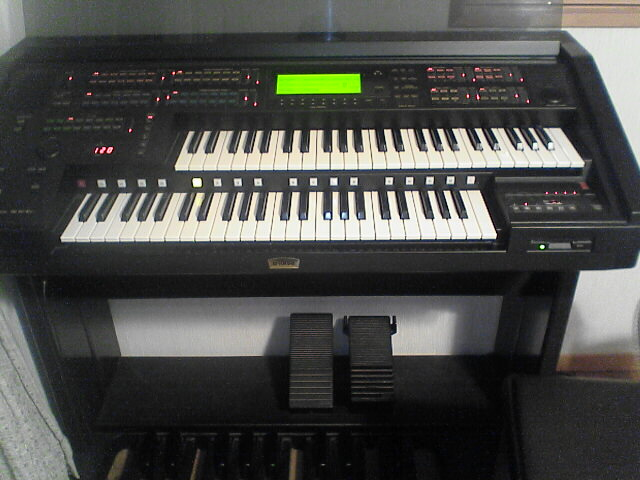
EL-900m (2000) a high-grade model comparable with ELX-1m

Yamaha began exporting Electones to the United States starting with the D-2B in 1967.

1958 — E-T Prototype
The E-T was a prototype concept by Nippon Gakki (known today as Yamaha). It consisted of one console, four oscillators, a tone-forming part widening device, and three speakers. The consoles consisted of a three-stage keyboard, a 32-key pedal keyboard, and 171 switches of sounds and other functions.
1959 — Prototype ET-5 and EM-6
In May 1959, the prototype ET-5 was manufactured, along with the prototype EM-6, a single-stage keyboard utilizing transistor technology.
1959 — D-1
The first model of Electone that was launched by Yamaha, starting with the price around ¥350.000 at that time.
1960 — A-2
The first Electone model with a single keyboard and a single octave pedal. With the price of ¥128.000, it was mostly used for students. Discontinued in 1963.
1962 — E-1
The highest-end Electone model at that time, with a starting price of ¥647.000 in 1962.
1964 — F-1
Electone's first "pipe organ" model. It was built for 15 years, from 1964 to 1979, despite this it has remained in relative obscurity. With a launch price of around ¥2,200,000, it was the most expensive Electone model of its era.
1966 — A-3
Electone's first combo organ, it was only equipped with a single keyboard and an expression pedal.
1966 — F-2
Another "pipe organ" model similar to the F-1, released with an initial price of around ¥1,350,000. It was discontinued in 1975.
1967 — D-2B
The first Electone Model that was imported by Nippon Gakki to the United States.
1968 — E-3
Yamaha's top model at that time, commonly used for stage purposes. Its original price tag was ¥800,000.
1968 — EX-21 Prototype
The EX-21 was a prototype intended to illustrate the upcoming futuristic, space-age style stage organ models of the future. Unlike prior Electones, it was expressly designed for stage performances. Named for "21st century" technology, it can be heard on the "Electone Fantastic!" album.
1970 — EX-42
Yamaha's first commercially available stage model Electone, and the commercial successor to the EX-21. It was the first Electone to use integrated circuits, although it was still based on analogue technology. Famous Electone players such as Shigeo Sekito used this instrument to make the "Special Sound Series", known as "華麗なるエレクトーン" (1975-1977). It was built from 1970 until 1977, launching in 1970 in Japan for ¥2,800,000. In the US, the EX-42 had a $32,000 price tag or $200,000 when adjusted for inflation. It is likely that less than 200 of these were built.
1972 — D-3R
Another top model of Electone, mostly used for homes.
1974 — Designing of Electones around synthesisers, instead of organs
1974 — CSY-1
Based on the SY-1 synthesizer.
1975 — GX-1 (a.k.a. GX-707)
The first polyphonic synthesizer in Electone form, bridging the gap between synthesizer and organ. It used velocity-sensitive keyboards and the solo keyboard was even after-touch sensitive. The original price tag at that time was around ¥7,000,000. Some notable users of the GX-1 include Richard D. James,. Stevie Wonder, Keith Emerson, John Paul Jones, and Benny Andersson of ABBA.
1977 — EX-1, EX-2
The third generation of space-age stage Electone models. The EX-1 and EX-2 sold for ¥3,600,000 and ¥2,600,000, respectively.
1977 — E-70
One of the first home-based organs to feature Yamaha's PASS (Pulse Analog Synthesis System) in a console cabinet. The E-70's architecture resembles the famous CS-80 synthesizer, though it lacked analog VCOs. Its original price tag was ¥1,800,000.
1979 — CN-70
A single-keyboard model marketed to music schools.
1980 — D-700
A more advanced and upgraded version of its predecessor models.
1983 — FS and FX series (FC/FE/FS/FX)
It featured frequency modulation tone generators, with the FX series featuring the company's first digitally sampled sounds for the onboard percussion/rhythm units. The F series Electones were the first to allow users to digitally save registrations via pistons and then save them to RAM packs or an external disk drive unit with the MDR-1. It is also known as the fourth generation of the space-age stage models, costing around ¥4,500,000. While the lower version of the FX-1, the FX-3, cost around ¥2,000,000. Along with the FS-30m, cost around ¥1,100,000. The FX-10 cost around ¥1,900,000, while the FX-20 cost around ¥2,200,000. The FE-30m retailed for ¥490,000.
1983 — CN-1000
A single chord organ model.
1985 — ME series
A smaller and more compact Electone series, starting with the ME-15 and ending at the ME-600. It was discontinued in 1989. The ME-600 retailed for around ¥580,000, while the ME-15 launched with a price of ¥204,000.
1987 — HS and HX series (HA/HC/HE/HK/HS/HX)
The HS and HX series represented a transition to more digital technology for the Electone line. Integrated circuit technology resulted in vastly smaller components, leading to a sleeker design. The HX/HS series was the first to use AWM (Advanced Wave Memory) sampling technology for both voices and rhythms, and also featured 16-operator FM voices. AWM voice expansion was also possible via sound packs. Even smaller versions were also available as the HK-10 and HA-1. The HK-10 had the same design as the HC series devices, but sported a bigger cover. The HA-1 was a chord organ version and is rarely seen today, despite being manufactured from 1988 to 2001. The original price for the HS-8 was ¥835,000, while the HX-1 cost around ¥3,321,000.
1991 — EL series
This series included an attached Music Disk Recorder which enabled players to record their registrations and performances, thus eliminating the need for extensive programming before each performance. The EL series introduced new synthesisers, filtering, and expression technologies that made instrument voices on the Electone even more realistic. Voice technology continued to be based on AWM and FM technologies. The EL-90 cost around ¥1,250,000, while the ELX-1 cost twice the EL-90 at around ¥2,700,000.
1996 — AR series
The AR100 and its junior model the AR80 (released in 1997), were designed for the US and European market and reverted to the more traditional cabinet design. Using purely AWM voices, the most distinctive feature of the series was its 384 preset registrations, a huge increase compared to only 5 presets on the EL series.
1998 — EL-900 (Second version of EL series)
Visually similar to the EL90 model from 1991, but with more voices, rhythms and effects, the most significant change of this model is the inclusion of VA (Virtual Acoustic) voices. These voices, or preset sounds, do not use sampling technology but are instead based on modeling, providing an enhanced degree of authenticity.
2000 — ELX-1m
Visually similar to the EL90 model from 1991, but with more voices, rhythms and effects, the most significant change of this model is the inclusion of VA (Virtual Acoustic) voices. These voices, or preset sounds, do not use sampling technology but are instead based on modeling, providing an enhanced degree of authenticity.
2004 — Stagea Series
This brand new Electone line-up series added around 415 voices and sounds in the standard model (ELS-01), including "articulation voices". These models were only sold in the Asian Pacific region due to low demand from Europe and America.
2005 — ELS-01C and ELS-01X
The ELS-01X had 2 61-key keyboards and 25 pedalboard keys. Both this version and its custom model variant the ELS-01C had around 509 voices with articulation.
2006 — ELB-01
A Stagea line-up product mainly used for children and students in Electone courses. The ELB-01K version came out later in 2006.
2007 — D-Deck (DDK-7)
Another Stagea line-up product, but more compact, and mostly used for concerts. It was designed as a combo organ, similar to the Hammond Portable B-3.
2009 — ELS-01U / ELS-01CU / ELS-01XU
A minor upgrade for first generation stagea models.
2014 — "02" Stagea series.
The new make-over of 2nd generation of Stagea series. It consisted of three main models: the standard model (ELS-02), custom model (ELS-02C), and professional model (ELS-02X). It sported super-articulation voices, more registration banks, and double the voices and sounds included in the second generation model. The ELS-02 had around 986 voices and sounds. The ELS-02C and ELS-02X had around 1.080 voices and sounds. The basic model (ELS-02) started with a price of ¥715.000, while custom models (ELS-02C) started at ¥1.078.000. The professional model (ELS-02X) started at ¥1.738.000.
2016 — ELB-02
Like its predecessor the ELB-02, but with more advanced sounds and major updates. The original price with tax started around ¥198.000.
2016 — ELC-02
Another Stagea line-up product, and the successor of the Stagea D-DECK, designed as a combo organ. It is similar in design to the Hammond Portable B-3, and launched at ¥539.000, including tax.

== Glossary ==
ABC
Auto Bass Chord. Auto accompaniment function, in the form of backing chords and effects, activated when the lower keyboard is held while rhythms are playing.
Advanced Wave Memory
Yamaha's sound sampling technology introduced in the 90s. As of 2014, AWM has evolved to generation two and is usually termed AWM2 or AWMII.
Frequency Modulation
Yamaha's sound modelling technology used in Electones from the 70s to 90s. The final model to feature FM technology is the EL900 and all its variants.
Keyboard Percussion
Drums and percussion sounds that can be assigned to both keyboards and the pedalboard. Also used to create custom drum rhythms.
Lead Voice
The solo voice typically used for the melody line. Lead voices are monophonic on all Electone models.
Lower Keyboard Voice
General term referring to sounds selected and assigned to the lower keyboard. Polyphonic by preset.
Music Data Recorder (MDR, before Electone Stagea named Music Disc Recorder)
Memory storage device installed to, or part of Electone models from the HS series onwards. Allows storage and quick call up of complex sound and rhythm settings.
Melody On Chord (MOC)
Harmonizing effect activated on the lower keyboard based on note played on the upper keyboard.
Pedal Voice
General term referring to sounds selected and assigned to the pedalboard. Monophonic by preset except on the latest ELS-02 series.
Registration
Electone term referring to sounds selected for each keyboard and the pedal board. Includes also rhythm pattern selected. Also refers to user memory slots available on the Electone itself.
Rhythm
Drum patterns available on the Electone. Comes with different accompaniments.
Rhythm Sequence Program (RSP)
Sequencing function used to string different rhythm patterns together. When activated, the entire sequence plays by itself regardless of sound or memory changes on the Electone, thus allowing the player to concentrate on performance. Also allows for auto changing of registrations.
Rhythm Pattern Program (RPP)
Programming function for designing custom drum patterns and accompaniments.
Upper Keyboard Voice
General term referring to sounds selected and assigned to the upper keyboard. Polyphonic by preset.
Virtual Acoustic
Yamaha's sound modelling technology introduced with the EL900 in 1998. Features higher realism compared to Frequency Modulation. Continues to be available in top end models as of 2014.
Voices
General term referring to sounds on the Electone.

== Stagea series ==
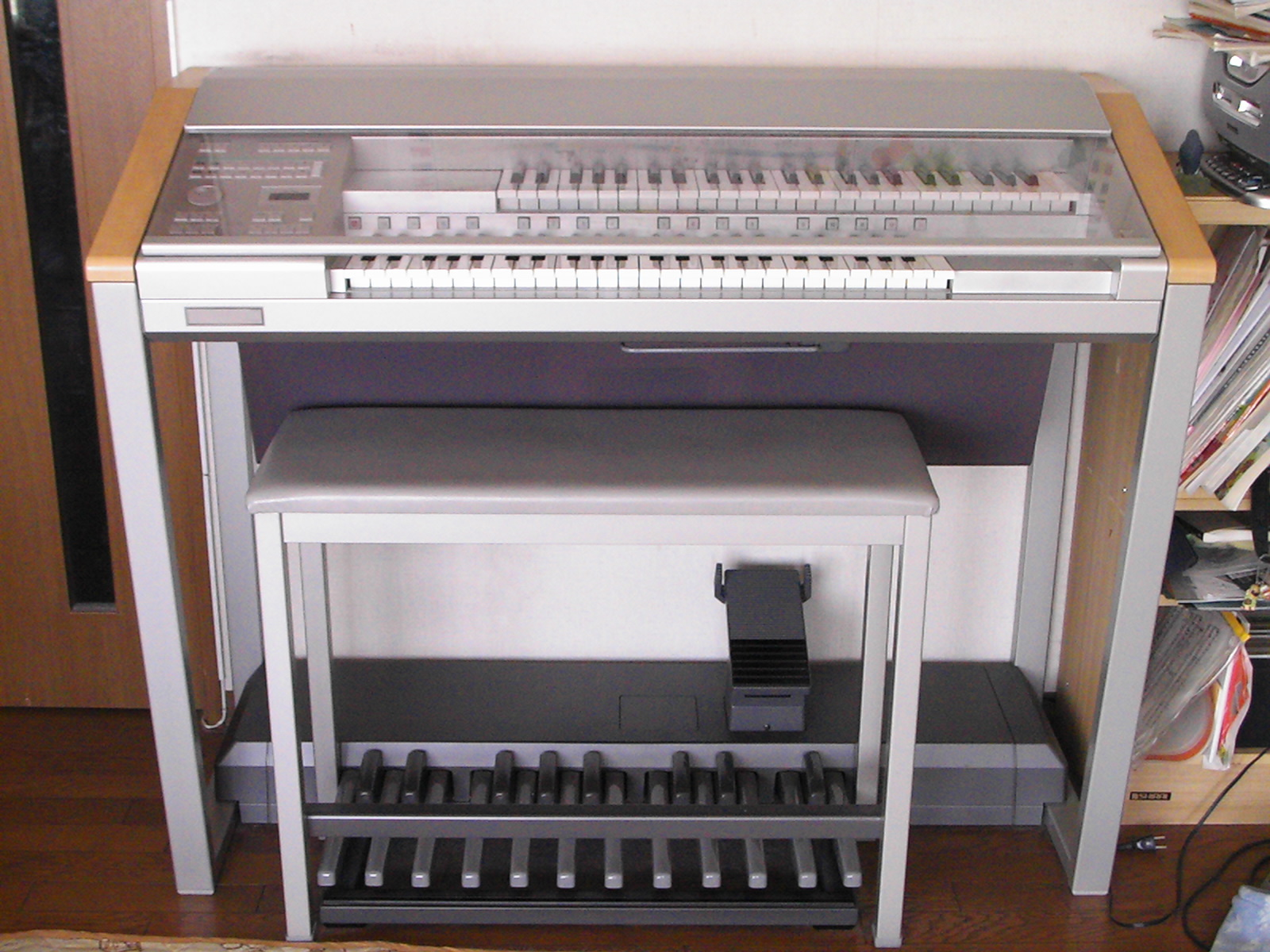
Yamaha Electone Stagea ELS 01

In 2004, Yamaha launched the Stagea series. This series uses all AWM (Advanced Wave Memory) voices and features over 180 digital effects, built-in registration menus, VA (Virtual Acoustic) voices, and a Style-File compatible expanded rhythm and accompaniment section. AWM is the proprietary sound sampling technology of Yamaha.

Models in this series are:

ELS-01: The standard model

ELS-01C: The custom model, carrying the ability to use the VA voices, Pitch and Tempo Bends, After touch on the pedal keyboard, horizontal touch and after pitch, along with other features, and lastly,

ELS-01X: The professional model - taking the ELS-01C, it adds 61-note keyboards, a 25-note pedal board and XLR external audio jacks.

The Stagea ELS-01 series was officially distributed only in Asian countries.

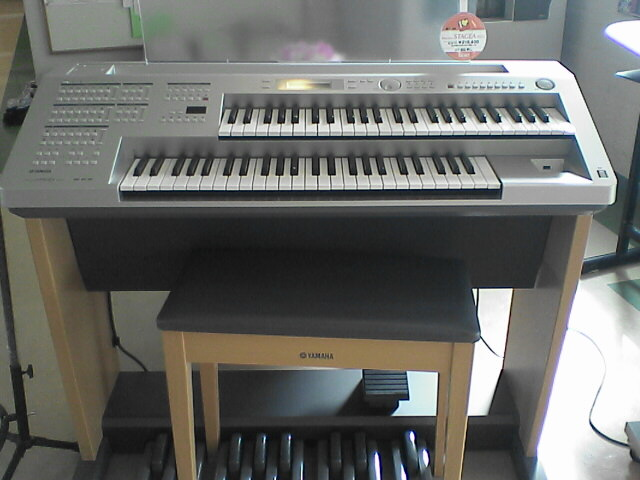
Electone Stagea mini ELB-01

In 2006, Yamaha added the ELB-01 model to the lineup. This is a students' model, with 245 AWM voices and 133 accompaniment rhythms, but without voice or rhythm editing capabilities.

In 2008, Yamaha added The D-Deck (DDK-7 in some markets), which is the portable version of the ELS-01 with a more compact body, 61 keys on the lower keyboard and an optional pedalboard. The D-Deck comes with all the features of the ELS-01, with the additions also of Organ Flute voices and a second expression pedal.

In 2009, the Stagea typeU series was launched, with only hardware differences between them and their original counterparts. The typeU version omitted the floppy drive UD-FD01 and the Smart-Media card slot.

In April 2014, Yamaha launched the Stagea ELS-02 series. This series features Super Articulation voices, on top of over 900 AWM sounds, 96 VA voices, pedalboard polyphony, effects, and 566 accompaniment rhythms. The ELS-01, ELS-01C and ELS-01X can also be upgraded to the current series by the use of a "Vitalize" unit.

The Stagea ELS-02 series currently has three models:

ELS-02: The standard model, with 506 AWM voices including Super Articulation voices, 506 accompaniment rhythms, and hundreds of audio effects.

ELS-02C: The custom model. Other than all the features of the ELS-02, it has an additional 60 AWM voices, VA voices, Organ Flutes voices (with digital drawbars), a second expression pedal, horizontal keyboard touch, and pedal board aftertouch.

ELS-02X: The professional model, which contains all the features of the ELS-02C but with both keyboards expanded to 61 keys and the pedalboard expanded to 25 full pedals.

Unlike the first Stagea series, the Stagea ELS-02 series is distributed in both Asia and Mexico.

In May 2016, the ELB-02 model was launched as a revamp of the ELB-01 model with more voices and rhythms added as well as the "after touch" feature on the upper and lower keyboards.

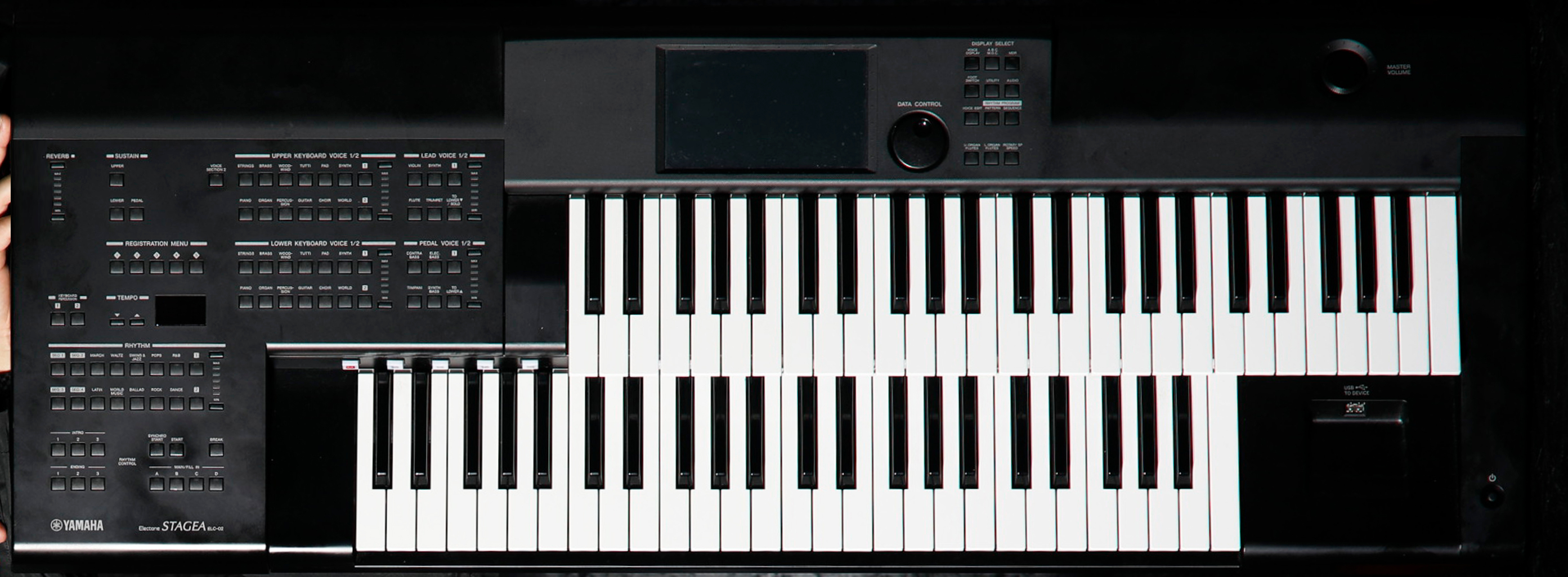
Stagea ELC-02 (top view)

ELC-02: In 2016, Yamaha launched the Stagea ELC-02. This model is a replacement for the Stagea D-Deck (DDK-7), this model contains most of the features of the ELS-02 such as Super Articulation voices. Unlike the previous D-Deck model, the ELC-02 does not contain a 61 note lower keyboard instead a standard 49 note keyboard resides in its place. Existing owners of the D-Deck can upgrade the main unit to the ELC-02 and use their current stand, expression pedals and speakers as is.

In 2022, Yamaha launched a new Electone, the ELA-1. This model is not part of the Stagea series, and is currently sold in China and Southeast Asia. This Electone shares the architecture of the Yamaha PSR SX600 portable keyboard and features 3 keyboards (upper, lower and bass pedals).

In January 2026, Yamaha launched the Stagea ELS-03 series, adding a 61-note lower keyboard and second expression pedal (as standard), a larger 9-inch display, Live Expression Control, assignable sliders, VCM organ sound engine, and a new FSX-i key action and polyphonic aftertouch (on higher-end models).

The ELS-03 series consists of four models:

ELS-03G: The standard portable model, featuring an FSX keyboard with aftertouch, a second expression pedal, a detachable stand, 1,697 AWM voices including Super Articulation voices, 1,009 accompaniment rhythms, 703 built-in registrations, VCM and Organ Flutes organ sounds, 9 assignable sliders (with a small LCD on top of each slider), and hundreds of DSP effects.

ELS-03X: The custom portable model. Other than all the features of the ELS-03G, it has an additional 94 VA voices, 60 registrations, an FSX-i keyboard with horizontal keyboard touch and polyphonic keyboard aftertouch, as well as pedal board aftertouch.

ELS-03XR: All the features of the ELS-03X in a form factor similar to the ELS-01 and ELS-02 series, with an integrated stand and full-width lid/music rest that also acts as a keyboard cover.

ELS-03XF: The professional model, which combines all the features of the ELS-03X and the form factor of the ELS-03XR, but with the pedalboard expanded to 25 full-size pedals. This is also the first professional Electone model without two 61-note keyboards, with this model having a 49-note upper keyboard and 61-note lower keyboard (the same as with other models in the ELS-03 series).

== Competition ==
The International Electone Festival (IEF)/International Electone Concours (IEC) is an Electone Organ competition organized by Yamaha which has its beginnings in the 1960s. The first edition of the competition initiated in 1964 as a Japanese national contest to promote and market the Electone as a viable creative and professional musical outlet, and featured both the solo performer and the Electone instrument with no other accompaniment present - a format that lasts till this day. The first purposefully branded international edition complete with a broader roster of contestants representing countries such as USA, Canada, Mexico, United Kingdom, Australia, South Africa, as well as European, Asian and South American countries, is noted as being held in October 1971. However, as earlier as 1969 and 1970, a small number of international entrants were invited to compete at the 'Electone Concours Grand Prix' event against a predominantly Japanese contingent of competitors in Tokyo. The IEF finals from these early editions were then held in Japan every year until 1984 when it was held in Los Angeles to mirror the city's Olympic Games hosting duties. Afterwards, Yamaha began holding subsequent IEF finals in other cities around the world including Hamburg, Toronto, Paris, Hong Kong, Mexico and Singapore before returning to Japan.

Notable musicians who were invited to be part of the adjudication panel included Jerry Goldsmith, Raymond Lefèvre and Keith Emerson of Emerson, Lake & Palmer. Participants in the IEF finals had to be at least 16 years of age and competed for medal awards and cash prizes. On almost every occasion, there was one "Grand Prize" recipient who would receive a gold medal and cash prize which in its last years totalled $10,000US. Before 1982, a selection of participants were also presented with special Winner's prizes and the number of recipients of this award varied from year to year. After 1982, "Most Outstanding Performance" awards were presented to two (or in some instances three or four) participants who would receive a silver medal and cash prize, and "Outstanding Performance" awards were usually presented to three participants who would receive a bronze medal and cash prize. On rare occasions at IEF finals, a special President's award may also have been presented to one performer. Known as the "Kawakami Prize" it was named after renowned Yamaha Music Corporation President Genichi Kawakami and consisted of a special bronze medal and cash prize very similar to the "Outstanding Performance" award. By the mid to late 1990s Yamaha ceased to sponsor the event as the broader international competition it once was, keeping it a solely Japanese and Asian region contest by the turn of the new millennium. This change, which reflected the company's decision to decrease its global Electone market to these territories exclusively, continues to this day as the Yamaha Electone Concours .

International Electone Festival Finals

Anniversary	Year	City, Country	Venue, Instrument model(s)	Grand Prix award	Most Outstanding Award	Outstanding Award	Special Jury or 'Kawakami' Prize	Finalist (Country) - Selection
8th	1971	Nemu-no-sato, Japan	EX-42, E-3, E-3R, E-5, D-7, D-2B	*Tomoko Watanabe (Japan) - Hoedown, *Leslie Strand (U.S.A) - ?	*Keiko Ohta (Japan) - ? *Yaeko Sakamoto (Japan) - Tarkus, *Daniel Hetu (Canada) - Fidor Fador More, *Kurumi Shibihara (Japan) - Introduction, *Haruo Inoue (Venezuela) - ?	N/A	*Hesiquio Ramos (Mexico) - West Side Story,	*Yoshitaka Yasumoto (Japan) - Love Duet, *Noriyasu Inoue (Japan) - Black Magic Woman, *Aiko Hirano (Japan) - Light My Fire, *Kunio Ohta (Japan) - フォレスト・フラワー, Setsuko Shimizu (Japan) - いそしぎ, *Kaisaku Ashizawa (Japan) - 大漁うたいこみの調, *Yumiko Tashibana (Japan) - Love Story, *Sumiko Ohashi (Japan) - Naomi's Dream, *Noriko Honda (Japan) - You'd Be So Nice To Come To, *Malcolm Ross (Australia) - Scarborough Fair, *Tilly Lam (Hong Kong) - Spy Operation, *Andiono Arie (Indonesia) - Ode To Billy Joe, *Asbjorn Valaker (Norway) - Going Out Of My Head, *Kazuko Kamasuto (Japan) - 枯葉, *Antonio Cuyugan (Philippines) - Cry Me A River, *Helen Lowe (South Africa) - African Kuvella, *Dorothy Wang (Singapore) - Graduation, *Ming Cheng Huang (Taiwan) - My Funny Valentine, *Raht Ketusingha (Thailand) - Promise Promise
9th	1972	Nemu-no-sato, Japan	EX-42, E-3, E-5	*Claude Dupras (Canada) - Raindrops, *Rocco Ferrante Jr (U.S.) - Yesterday and Night, *Tomoyo Miyama (Japan) - Rhapsody	*Akira ("Masa") Matsuda (Japan) - The Closed World, *Mutsuko Okumura (Japan) - In Berlin, *唯井 明代 Shibahara (Japan) - C Sharp Minor Waltz, *Sebastian Cacabelos Soutullo (Venezuela) - Garcia Rhapsody, *Georges Fleury - (Switzerland) - Love You	N/A	*芝原 くるみ (Japan) - Theme from Ironside,	*Greg Moeser (Australia) - Jesus Christ Superstar, *Gordon Griffiths (United Kingdom) - Beatles Medley, *Henk Balijon (Netherlands) - Love You, *Billy Tsong (Hong Kong) - Wind Whisper, *Andy Alley Ono (Indonesia) - Beatles Medley, *Carmen Tamés Mejiá (Mexico) - Son de la Negra, *Francisco ("Toti") Fuentes (Philippines) - From Bach to Bacharach, *Ludolff Smuts Wium (South Africa) - Black Orpheus, *Teresa Filmer (Singapore) - Jesus Christ Superstar, *Inn Shien Huang (Taiwan) - Mr Lucky, *M.L.Pratintip Devakula (Thailand) - Trish Trash Polka, *Lyman E. Strong (U.S.) - Bacharach Medley, *Michael Schau (West Germany) - Love You, *照井 栞 (Japan) - Wife and Girlfriend, *Reiko Kashiwagi (Japan) - Pictures at an Exhibition,.
10th	1973	Nemu-no sato, Japan	EX-42, E-5	*Bobby Lyle (U.S.) - Dance of Love and Peace, *Akira ("Masa") Matsuda (Japan) - Mysterious Dimension, *唯井 明代 Shibahara (Japan) - Eruption	*Yoshi Osamu Nakagawa (Japan) - Alice caught in the Looking Glass, *Maritess Salientes (Philippines) - Passacaglia in C Minor, *Raimund Pranschke (West Germany) - Borikuito, *Hendra Widjaja (Indonesia) - Days of Wine and Roses	N/A	*Martha Patricia Morales Barrera (Mexico) - Uapango	*Dirk Leonard (Australia) - George Gershwin Medley, *Julio Camargo Carone (Brazil) - Bebe, *Rodger Niznik (Canada) - Goldfinger, *Robert Jansen (Netherlands) - Burt Bacharach Medley, *Leandro Bautista (Hong Kong) - Lullaby of Birdland, *Hoon Kim Huat (Malaysia) - Wan Chu Chin, *Ove Hetland (Norway) - Dry Leaves, *Theuns Van Rensburg (South Africa) - Work Song, *Cheng Tau Sin (Singapore) - Valley of the Evening Twilight, *Jose Villacanas (Spain) - People, *Huang Ming Cheng (China) - Cabaret, *Raht Ketusingha (Thailand) - PROMISES! PROMISES! PROMISES!', *James Friemark (U.S.) - Wizard of Oz, *Jose Garcia Guinot (Venezuela) - My System.
11th	1974	Nemu-no Sato, Japan	EX-42, E-5	*Socorro De Castro (U.S.) - Theme from The Mod Squad, *Reiko Kashiwagi (Japan) - Prelude	*Kenriyou Yoshimoto (Japan) - Freedom Jazz Dance, *Hiromi Sato (Japan) - Invitation to the 21st Century, *Yayoi Yoshida (Japan) - Apple Pie, *Claude Lander (Switzerland) - Cathedral, *Alvin Kwok (Hong Kong) - Abrupt End	N/A	*James Levesque (U.S.) - George Gershwin Medley,	*Russell Finch (Australia) - One Note Samba, *Jacqueline Reggio (Brazil) - Mojave, *Fabio Valente (Brazil) - A Espera, *Relly Coloma (Canada) - I Got Rhythm, *Hugo Alvarado (Mexico) - La Malaguena, *Carolyn Kleiner (Philippines) - Taghoy ng Lupa, *Dorothy Shaw (Singapore) - Dawn,.
12th	1975	Nemu-no Sato, Japan	GX-1	*Yayoi Hirabe (Japan) - Rhapsody on GX	*Manuel Panta (Philippines) - Bach/Tchaikovsky Medley, *Summer Kei Horiba (Japan) - Sinfonia, *Width 滋美 (Japan) - Police Woman, *Tamam Hoesein (Indonesia) - Es Lilin, *Tito Enriquez (Mexico) - Fantasia Latin America	N/A	N/A	*Julie-Ann Hanlon (Australia) - Wind Blues "Pictures at an Exhibition" *Günter Schwarz (Austria) - September, *Nilson Zago (Brazil) - Bruno de Jekibau Baranso, *Antonio Macedo (Brazil) - Samba Samba Samba, *Darcy Naife (Canada) - Eleanor Rigby, *Louis Tortora (France) - Soleado, *Gilbert Lo (Hong Kong) - Motion Pictures, *Larry Keenan (U.S.) - Space, *John Modrowsky (U.S.) - Beatles Medley.
13th	1976	Nemu-no Sato, Japan	GX-1	*Yumiko Tanaka (Japan) - Divertimento	*Ito 由実子 (Japan) - Autumn in Sofia, *Sensho Hayashi (Japan) - Waves Of Light, *Raht Ketusingha (Australia) - Australia, *David Smith (United Kingdom) - 1812 Overture, *Gilbert Lo (Hong Kong) - Fantasy on GX, *Bupha Dhamabuttr (Thailand) - Ashanji	N/A	*Hiromi Sato (Japan) - Meditation on 25 O'Clock	*Guy Tassé (Canada) - All You, *Ruud Jansen (Netherlands) - Love Confessions, *Luis Carlos González (Mexico) - Latin Dawn, *Omar Guzmán (Mexico) - Tarkus, *Miriam Uyboco (Philippines) - Music Moments, *Frank Loch (U.S.) - Chopin Impressions, *Paul Doerrfeld (U.S.) - An American in Paris, *Luis Jose Arias (Venezuela) - Concerto for Voice.
14th	1977	Nemu-no sato, Japan	GX-1	*Oshima Michiru (Japan) - Gloria	*Width 滋美 (Japan) - Dancing "18", *南部 昌江 (Japan) - Sunrise, *Danny Baker (U.S.) - Christine's Samba, *Rodger William Niznik (Canada) - Manipulation, *Louie J. Ocampo (Philippines) - Moods of Tina	N/A	*Jenny Tjahjono (Indonesia) - Sunset	*Bryan William Roberts (Australia) - Impressions of the Ionosphere, *Cèlio Balona Passos (Brazil) - Kantika, *Raul Castaño Escobar (Columbia) - Latin Landscapes, *José Alberto González (Costa Rica) - Diary of a Computer, *Louis Tortora (France) - Revolution, *Skip Van Rooy (Netherlands) - Nature *Leong Wai Meng (Singapore) - August 2nd, *Kumiko Kodera (Japan) - Tip-Top-Fly.
15th	1978	Nemu-no sato, Japan	GX-1	*Skip Van Rooy (Netherlands) - Relationships	*Rosy Chua (Malaysia) - Elite, *Michael Gundlach (West Germany) - Final Four Times, *Masashi Huzita (Japan) - Symphonic Rhapsody, *Yumiko Santon (Japan) - Airship Marshmallows, *Ito Yumiko (Japan) - Steps of September	N/A	*Jeannette G.R.Casuga (Philippines) - Neptune's Chamber	*Fernando Cruz (Mexico) - Toreador Banquet, *Fu-Mei Ma (China) - The Sea of Happiness, *Raimund Pranschke (West Germany) - Love Dance, *Isaac S. Rosenthal (U.S.) - Portrait of America, *Cheryl M.Smith (Australia) - Voyage to Peace, *Julia H.P.Wee (Singapore) - Piper Dreams, *Yasuo Miyauti (Japan) - Hamlet Overture, *大野 三知代 (Japan) - Let's Dance a Waltz.
16th	1979	Nemu-no-sato, Japan	GX-1	*Nozomi Moroi (Japan) - Windward Passage	*Hiroko Kawata (Japan) - Musica?, *Sensho Hayashi (Japan) - Eternal Sea, *Michael Behymer (U.S.) - Two Variations of One Theme, *Eileen Ng Ai Ling (Singapore) - Reflections of You, Yumi Nakata (Japan) - Bright Future	N/A	N/A	*Phillip K. Keveren (U.S.) - Portrait, *Paul August Li (Indonesia) - The Grey Shadow, *Tzer-Shiun Lin (China) - Mental Anguish, *Mark D.Matthews (Australia) - Corroboree on a Summer Day, *Maria Corazon Perez (Philippines) - Lost In A Dream.
17th	1980	Nemu-no-sato, Japan	GX-1	*Yasuyuki Kasori (Japan) - Grand Sinfonia No.2	*Hiroko Kawata (Japan) - Cosmic Rhapsody, *Akira Kobayashi (Japan) - Fiesta: One Two, *Yoshiko Doi (Japan) - Summer Dreaming '80, *Michael Gundlach (West Germany) - Workshop	N/A	N/A	*Juan Carlos de Martini (Argentina) - El Maltrecho, *Lynda Hulford (Australia) - Tracy, *Mervin Mauthe (Canada) - Oceanic Suite, *Yongyos Saengphaibul (Thailand) - New Breath of the New City, *Roberto Fuentes (Uruguay) - Imagenes de Montevideo, *Phillip Keveren (U.S.) - Cascade Suite, *Eleonora Paolino (Venezuela) - En Busca de una Esperanza, .
18th	1981	Nemu-no-sato, Japan	GX-1	*Reiko Matsumoto (Japan) - Daiwa Maharoba, *Natsue Enda (Japan) - Fantasia Alpha	*Tatsuko Torii (Japan) - Pure, *Noriaki Rin (Japan) - Autumn Door	N/A	*Eduardo Tadeu Montoro (Brazil) - Soldier Boy	Luis Fernando Luna Guarneros (Mexico) - Maniixni, *Yung Man Leng (Singapore) - Horizon, *Staffan Hedman (Sweden) - Aiolos, *Dan Rodowicz (U.S.) - Comme Le Jour
19th	1982	Tokyo, Japan	GX-1/EX-1/D-85	Yasuo Miyauchi (Japan) - 荒城の月変奏曲	*Kiyoko Koyama (Japan) - The Sphinx, *Yukie Tsunokuma (Japan) - Quincy Quincy,	*Piergiorgio Marotti (Italy) - Model F, *Tomoko Yoshida (Japan) - Appassionata, *Tohru Yoshizawa (Japan) - African Symphony, *Walter Stowasser (West Germany) - The Barber of Seville	N/A	*Deanna MacDonald (Canada) - Armageddon, *Ian Sell (Australia) - Transition, *Miho Kodama (Japan) - Dark Eyes, *Enrique Ordoñez Martinez (Mexico) - Barada Mehikana, *Alberto Vicente Santos (Philippines) - Ulilang Bituin, *Stanley Koyama (U.S.) - Cheek to Cheek/I've Got Rhythm, *Sandra Aparecida Ribeiro (Brazil) - Sintonia, *Soh Wee Tee (Singapore) - Forgotten Empire
20th	1983	Tokyo, Japan	Kan'i Hoken Hall/FX-1	Keiko Tanimura (Japan) - Come Glorious Light Again (K.Tanimura)	*John Teare Corlett (Australia) - Switched on Sonatas, *Lupita Romero Ponce (Mexico) - Flight of the Bumblebee, *Mizuno Yoshiko (Japan) - Phoenix, *Katsuse Truth (Japan) - Creation,	*Lennart Palm (Sweden) - Endless Pain,, *Yuki Huzihara (Japan) - Pioneer Pulse, *Ishizaki Miyuki (Japan) - Hymn Republic, *Hiroko Muta (Japan) - Departure,	N/A	*Lennie Campbell (Canada) - Eurasia, *Carlton Liu (Hong Kong) - Variations in C Major, *Didier Montellier (France) - Hallelujah, *Hidebrand Brasil Bordi (Brazil) - Railroad, *Norman Adviento Agatep (Philippines) - Likha, *Marcel Josef Himbert (West Germany) - Sinfonia, *Edward M. Goldfarb (U.S.) - Excerpts from the Suite for Violin and Jazz Piano,.
21st	1984	Los Angeles, U.S.	/FX-1	Tatsuko Torii (Japan) - The Skyscraper (T.Torii)	*Thomas Folenta (U.S.) - Tomarbar, *Toshinori Suzuki (Japan) - Eternal Sea	*Luis Estrella (Spain) - Rhapsody In Blue, *Ya-Hui Wang (Singapore) - Toccata, *Hanson Tan (Philippines) - Bursting Out	N/A	*Joan Misako Nakanmoto (Canada) - Tarkus, *Greg Norrod (U.S.) - Journey To Perfection, - Gasto Alberto Marsanich (Italy) - Toccata, *Mark Wyer (Australia) - War Of The Worlds, *Hector Manuel Islas Licona (Mexico) - Luzarkana, * Ronald H.Van Barele (Netherlands) - Musica Esperanto, *Erik Holsten (Norway) - Progressive Tension.
22nd	1985	Hamburg, West Germany (Congress Centre Hamburg)	/FX-1	Toshio Mori (Japan) - 流火(Ryuuka)	*Sueko Tsunoda (Japan) - Bright Times, *Ya-Hui Wang (Singapore) - Eternal Sea	*Jan Veenje (Netherlands) - Symphony Historique, *Mei-Li Pai (Taiwan) - Tropical Isle Emerald, *Gregory Brian Mackintosh (U.S.) - Baroque, Be-Bop, Ballad, Brass	N/A	*Andrew Leonard Campbell (Canada) - Scenescape, *Stela Jizar Orfano Caldeira (Brazil) - Baiao Brásil, *Stefan Flemmerer (West Germany) - Ever Changing Moods, *Bruno Yamasaki Matsumoto (Mexico) - La Fuerza de los Imperios, *Ferruccio Premici (Italy) - Il Vole del Calabrene, *Nicklas Sivelöw (Sweden) - Finding the Way, *Deone Lee Wilson (Australia) - Creation, the Sixth Day,
23rd	1986	Toronto, Canada	/FX-1	Chihiro Yamashita (Japan) - 華麗なるファンタジー(A Fantasia)	*Louis Tortora (France) - Variations from Suspiria, *Norikazu Kawano (Japan) - 時経(Picturesque Time)	*Mary Ueda Ritsuko (Canada) - Petrouchka, *Stephen Kurniawan Tamadji (Indonesia) - Sunset In Bali, *Stefan Flemmerer (West Germany) - Barock	N/A	*John Gregory Matas Aquias (Philippines) - Likha, *John Donald Bates (U.K) - Touch, *Paul Joseph Doerrfeld (U.S.) - Chorale and Fantasy on "Simple Gifts, *George Charles Heldt (Canada) - Riches to Rage, *Shane Michael Parker (Australia) - Scheherazade (The Festival at Baghdad), *Nicklas Lars Sivelöw (Sweden) - Into a New World, *Jorge Raul Suarez (Argentina) - Juana Azurduy, *Ricardo Uma (Costa Rica) - Carmina Burana.
24th	1987	Tokyo, Japan	Kan'i Hoken Hall/FX-1	Yukio Nakamura (Japan) - Somewhere In The Night (Y.Nakamura)	*Risa Funaki (Japan) - Rise Of Spring, *Arturo Sánchez Guzzi (Mexico) - Grados Indigenas	*Jason Nyberg (U.S.) - Strike It Up, *Warwick Dunham (Australia) - Excerpts from Bernstein's 'Mass', *Racquel Ayeras Rañola (Philippines) - Silver Screen.	*Risa Funaki (Japan) - Rise of Spring	*Kaon Koo (Canada) - Rain Walk, *Terence Swee-Seng Teo (Singapore) - Olympia, *Roberto Cedeño Laya (Venezuela) - Sonata Venezolana, *Lena Sannerstig (Sweden) - Die Fledermaus Overture, *Martin Harris (United Kingdom) - Contrasts, *Rainer Georg Dittrich (West Germany) - The Eternal Stream, *Gabriel Huynh (France) - Si, C'etait Demain,.
25th	1988	Paris, France	/HX-1	Jason Geh (Malaysia) - Hallucination (J.Geh)	*Tatsuki Watanabe Atsushi (Japan) - And The Sun Shines!, *Mia Soetanto (Indonesia) - Evening In Bali	*Valérie Boggio (France) - La Confession d'Uranus, *Paul Wei Chung Liang (Singapore) - Festive Overture (Shostakovich), *Adelmo Listorti (West Germany) - City Movements	N/A	*Hector Islas (Mexico) - Centuria, *Linda Eckert (U.S.) - Jupiter from The Planets, *Jason Klein (Canada) - Conversations, *Marcelo Maranghello (Argentina) - Mosaico Latino, *Lena Sannerstig (Sweden) - Overture from "Pastoral Suite" Op.19, *Rodney Pooley (U.K) - American Patrol, *Fabrizio Brezzo (Italy) - La Forza del Destino - Overture, *Anthony Kenney (Australia) - A Fairytale Relived, *Mayumi Takane (Japan) - Au Coin De Montmatre.
26th	1989	Hong Kong	Hong Kong Convention & Exhibition Centre/HX-1	Saori Iwauchi (Japan) - Symphonic Rhapsody No.2 (S.Iwauchi)	*Ng Chai Li (Malaysia) - GEM, *Enrique Arturo Escalante Lujan (Mexico) - Raices	*Hitoshi Kotani (Japan) - Hibari-Twilight Scenery, *Stéphane Criado (France) - Comme Dans Un Songe, *Ferdinand Marsa (Indonesia) - Panji Semirang	N/A	Sandy DiGirolamo (U.S.) - On The Waterfront, *Ruth Bernardine Varney (Australia) - Xenophobia, *Robert Messier (Canada) - Powerful People, *Jaana Marja Peltonen (Finland) - From Dream To Reality, *Alex Wong Wai Chung (Hong Kong) - Silhouette, *Smith Bandithaya (Thailand) - Living Float, *Stephen John Selwood (United Kingdom) - A Woodpecker's Anecdote*José L. Souto Colina (Venezuela) - "Fantasia Criolla".
27th	1990	Mexico City, Mexico	The City Theater/HX-1	Chinami Taki (Japan) - Humpty Dumpty (C.Taki)	*Bruno Yamasaki Matsumoto (Mexico) - El Niño Colibrí, *Joachim Wolf (Germany) - El Avispa	*Goh Chee Seng (Malaysia) - Midnight Dream, *Hiromi Suzuki (Japan) - Rhapsody Espagnole, *Teh- Chiang Yuang (Taiwan) Time Passing.	N/A	*Philip George Newns (Canada) - Rhapsody in Blue, *Tony Matthew Austin (Australia) - Squib Cakes, *Omar Arroyo Garcia (Costa Rica) - Danza del Sable, *Debra Fleming (U.S.) - West Side Story, *Sirpa Ojala (Finland) - Take Five, *Syilvia Dewi Estiningrum (Indonesia) - Sunset In Bali, *Gaston Marsonich (Italy) - Toccata, *Miriam Teresa González Hernández (Mexico) - Herencia IndeÏgena, *Kerry Jayne Stanton (United Kingdom) - Fantasy,.
28th	1991	Tokyo, Japan	Kan'i Hoken Hall/HX-1	Chinami Kawasaki (Japan) - A Scene - Time For Sowing (C.Kawasaki)	*Yuki Toda (Japan) - Rhapsody, *Carsten Jarocki (Germany) - Fairytale	*Stephen Tromans (U.K) - Great Expectations, *Raussel Renata Cedeño Laya (Venezuela) - Orinoquia, *Danny Lim Teong Chin (Malaysia) - Kingdom Of Black Panther	*Tanya Hulbert (Australia) - Tianenmen, June 4th, 1989	*Roberto Mistichelli (Italy) - War from Rocky IV, *Arnaud Fabien Fourniguet (France) The Sorcerer's Apprentice, *Albert Lawrence Villaruz (Canada) - War from Rocky IV, *Clarice Marie Weathers (U.S.) - Ballet Mechanique, *Rene Monterosa Sanchez (Mexico) - Final Night, *Chun Chun Yang (Taiwan) - Moments Musicaux, *Ching I Lu (Taiwan) - Fantastic Festival.
29th	1992	Kyoto, Japan	Kyoto Kaikan Hall/ELX-1, EL-90, HX-1	Kaon Koo (Canada) - Alice In Shanghai (E.Corpus)	*Kaoru Ono (Japan) - Sensitivity, *Emi Saiki (Netherlands) - Voyage to the Far East,	*Ohta Mayumi (Japan) - Symphonic Dances, *Ken Lee Ming Yi (Malaysia) - Joy Of Spring, *Ruben Martorell Y Bayon (Spain) - William Tell Overture.	N/A	*Chiemi Colleen Middleton (U.S.) - Sleeping Beauty Waltz, *Darren Grech (Australia) - Arion, *Anabel Rosales Casco (Mexico) - Dreams, *Jose Luis Souto (Venezuela) - Taurepana, *Thio Kah Shiu Ernest Zhang (Singapore) - Promised Land, *Gianluca Bertolo (Italy) - Mirror, *Robin Yann (France) - Anastasia, *Dominicus Levi Gunardi (Indonesia) - スミランの旗.
30th	1993	Singapore	World Trade Centre, Harbour Pavilion/ELX-1, EL-90	Daiju Kurasawa (Japan) - Well You Needn't (T.Monk)	*Hitoshi Utsumi Hazime (Japan) - Piano Concerto in F, *Eric Leong (Singapore) - Feline(Alley Cats), *Elver Sohrab C. Perez (Philippines) - Talinhaga	*Tricia Ann S. Villareal (Philippines) - Seascapes, *Yani Danuwidjaya (Indonesia) - Seven-Eighth	N/A	*Leigh Robert Harrold (Australia) - Little Man Tate, *Jeff James Blake (Canada) - Back To The Future, *Brent William Mills (U.S.) - Festive Overture, *Carlos Alberto Gonzáles (Argentina) - Alma De Milonga, *Celso Gusben Marfil Simon (Mexico) - En La Ciudad De Los Dioses, *Anna Gerasi (Greece) - Auforderung Zum Tanz, *Andrea Gorini (Italy) - Impressions in the Park, *David Claire (France) - Dead Zone, *Paul Dingle (United Kingdom) - Joyrider,.
31st	1994	Tokyo, Japan	Kan'i Hoken Hall/ELX-1	*Jun'ichi Matsumoto (Japan), *Thomas Karcher (Germany),	*Carlton Liu (U.S.)	N/A	*Stephane Eliot (France)	Edward Chan (Hong Kong), Alfred Chan (United Kingdom), Brent William Mills (USA), Tomomi Takahashi (Australia), Pauline Ng (Canada), Wataru Fujimura (Japan), Clement Shaw (Malaysia), Bayornpat Jyntaprasert (Thailand).
32nd	1996	Tokyo, Japan	Kan'i Hoken Hall/ELX-1	*Yoshihiro Andoh (Japan)	*Zhu Lei (China)	*Linda Harjono (Indonesia)	*Joachim Wolf (Germany)	Roberto Marasciuolo (Italy), Tomoko Minemura (Japan), Sheila Vandikas (Canada), Yuen Siu Mun (Malaysia), Shinobu Karaki (Japan), Brent William Mills (USA), Rene Monte Rosa Sanchez (Mexico), Martial Illien (France).

== In popular culture ==
The Electone HX model appears briefly in the 1987 science fiction film The Running Man. When Ben Richards is in Amber's apartment (18 minutes into the film), he chases her around the Electone. Two scenes later (at the 20 minute mark), Richards, while standing over it, asks her what it is. Amber calls it her "synthesizer setup" and reveals that she wrote the ICS network jingle. (starting at 5:45 and 9:30 in this clip).

== Notable Electone Players ==
- Hiroshi Kubota (Japan)
- Masa Matsuda (Japan)
- Kaoru Ono (Japan)
- Koichi Oki (Japan)
- Reiko Kashiwagi (Japan)
- Hidemi Saito (Japan)
- Shiro Michi (Japan)
- Giorgio Marotti (Italy)
- Giuseppe Collaro (Italy)

== See also ==
- 826aska
