= Roland S-10 =

Synthesizer

Roland S-10 Digital Sampling Keyboard
- Manufacturer: Roland Corporation
- Dates: 1987

Technical specifications
- Polyphony: 8 voices
- Timbrality: 4-parts
- Synthesis type: analog
- Filter: Hi-pass, Low-pass filters
- Aftertouch expression: No
- Velocity expression: Yes
- Storage memory: 256 KB, 4.4 seconds total sample time

Input/output
- Keyboard: 49 Keys

The Roland S-10 Digital Sampling Keyboard is a 8-voice polyphonic synthesizer, produced by Roland Corporation in 1987. In the following year of 1988, an upgraded rack-mounted version, the Roland S-220 was released. The upgrade doubles the voice amount to 16, with 5 audio outputs, and only a 30 kHz sample rate.

== Features ==
The sampling specs consist of a 12-bit sample rate of both 15 kHz and 30 kHz, an auto-loop function, and MIDI control. The keyboard contains 256 KB of internal memory, which is divided into 4 banks (equal to 64 KB per bank). All 4 banks can be utilized simultaneously. The maximum sample time allotted is 4.4 seconds (1.1 seconds per bank). Effects are stackable and can be combined for up to five effects to be used at the same time. Samples can be stored and loaded through a built-in 2.8" floppy disk called the Quick Disk drive.

== Power ==
The unit runs on AC power only.
