= Jonos =

Defunct American computer systems company

Netcom Research, Inc.
- Logo of Jonos, Ltd.
- Formerly: Jonos, Ltd. (1980–1984); Jonos International (1984–1987)
- Type: Private
- Industry: Computer
- Founded: 1980; 46 years ago in Anaheim, California, United States
- Founder: John R. Amos
- Defunct: 1992; 34 years ago
- Fate: Dissolution
- Number of employees: 65 (1984, peak)
- Parent: Phoenix Group (1989–1992)

Jonos International, Inc., originally Jonos, Ltd. (JL), later Netcom Research, Inc., was an American computer company active from 1980 to 1992. The company sold a variety of computer hardware products and systems, including STD Bus peripherals, smart terminals, microcomputers, and portable computers. The company's Courier (later renamed Escort) portable computer was the first microcomputer sold with Sony's then-new 3.5-inch floppy disk drives on its release in June 1982. Jonos' systems were widely used in the fields of construction, roadworks, machining, and military.

== History ==
=== Foundation (1980–1982) ===
Jonos International was founded as Jonos, Ltd., by John R. Amos in Anaheim, California, in 1980. The name Jonos is a contraction of the founder's name, although the company also played with its homonymous similarity to the name of the prophet Jonas, by quipping in advertising that their products were a "whale of a deal". Before founding his company, Amos had worked for Computer Automation in Newport Beach, California, in the late 1960s.

Jonos was initially a close-knit affair, with only 30 employees on its payroll in August 1983. Its first products were announced in late January 1982 as the JL-32K—a RAM/EPROM card for STD Bus systems supporting up to 32 KB of RAM and a 2.7-KB EPROM—and the 100 Series and the 101 Series smart terminals (the former with an integrated keyboard, the latter detached).

=== Portable lines (1982–1987) ===
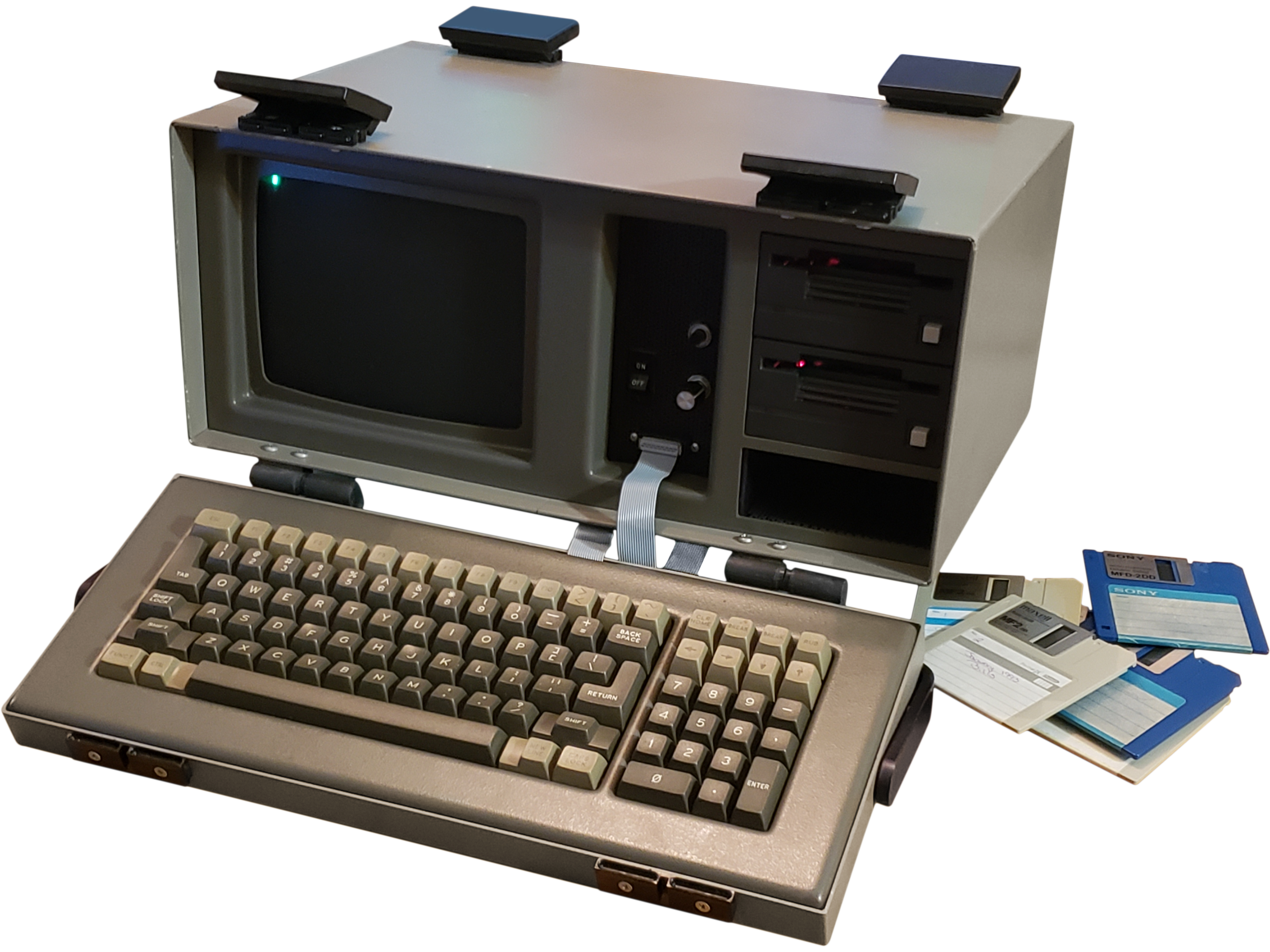
A Jonos Escort C2150 from 1983, next to a stack of 3.5-inch floppy disks. Jonos was the first company to ship a computer with 3.5-inch floppy drives.

In May 1982, Jonos signed a deal with Japan-based Sony Corporation worth over US$1 million for the latter to supply their newly released 3.5-inch floppy disk drives for use in Jonos' forthcoming microcomputers. These microcomputers included the Courier series of portable computers and the Diplomat and Sentry series of desktop computers. This lineup represented Jonos' debut in the computer systems market. Although Sony had inked a much larger deal with Hewlett-Packard (HP) for Sony's 3.5-inch drives, worth over $30 million, earlier that May, Jonos beat both Sony and HP to market with a computer system featuring Sony's 3.5-inch floppy disk format as a means of data storage with the release of the Courier portables (Sony first released a word processor with the drive in 1981). (Note: Hewlett-Packard's first system with 3.5-inch floppy drives, the HP 100 Model 125, did not ship until November 1982. Sony's microcomputer debut of the technology, the SMC-70, was available for purchase in September 1982, though Sony included the drive in their Series 35 word processor (OA-S3300), announced in 1980 and released in 1981.) The Courier line was publicly unveiled under a month later at the National Computer Conference in Houston, Texas, in June 1982, where it was given a list price of US$3,995. The first units shipped in the same month.

The Courier systems initially comprised the Model 2100 and the Model 2500, the former with dual 3.5-inch floppy disk drives and the latter with a single 3.5-inch disk drive and a 5 MB, 3.5-inch hard disk drive sourced from Rodime. As well as being the first to offer a 3.5-inch floppy drive, Jonos was also one of the first companies to offer a computer with a 3.5-inch hard disk drive by Rodime, who invented the standard. Both the 2100 and 2500 are powered by Zilog's Z80A microprocessor, clocked at 4 MHz. Meanwhile, a separate Intel 8085 microprocessor drives the keyboard controller and video output. As was common for Z80-based microcomputers, the computer came shipped with Digital Research's CP/M disk operating system; uncommon for the time, it was distributed on a 3.5-inch disk, to work in the systems' then-cutting-edge floppy drives. Each Courier unit measures 17 by 13 by 7 inches (43 by 33 by 18 cm) and features 9-inch-wide CRT monitors and 92-key, Selectric-style keyboards.

The Courier's cases were built from thick, sand-blasted aluminum sheets, fit for military use. An optional leather carrying case stitched by Gucci was also offered. Another option was a 10-lb printer unit that attaches to the back of the case when folded out, extending the computer's depth by four inches. For further expansions, the Couriers offer eight internal STD Bus slots. The backplane-based nature of the Courier meant that the computer was not limited to one microarchitecture; the CPU was housed on a STB Bus card, and users could replace the entire deck of cards to switch the computer from a Z80 to an Intel 8088, for example, as was later optioned (see below). It was one of the few portables ever offered with a backplane.

In August 1982, Jonos released a litany of STD expansion cards for the Courier, including a real-time clock, a five-year lithium battery backup for the RAM, a graphics card, a hard disk controller, and additional RAM. The company also began selling Couriers with SyQuest's removable 3.5-inch hard drives that month. Simultaneously, the company announced that they had signed a deal with Olivetti to field service calls for Jonos' American customers. By March 1983, Jonos had begun rebranding the Courier as the Escort, after ITT Corporation had lobbied a trademark dispute at Jonos' offices; ITT had been offering a computer terminal system by the name Courier years before Jonos'.

By the fiscal year 1982, Jonos brought in between $1 million and $4.9 million in revenues. In April 1983 at COMDEX/Spring, Jonos unveiled the Model C68000, a portable computer powered by Motorola's 68000 microprocessor and running the Unix operating system. It shipped with 256 KB of memory stock, expandable to 1 MB. The company simultaneously released the C2150, an improved version of the C2100 featuring a faster 6-MHz Z80B processor and 128 KB of bank-switchable RAM; it also shipped with several of Jonos' optional expansion boards included stock, such as the internal graphics card, an external composite video card, the real-time clock, a parallel communications card and a floppy interface card that interfaces with an external eight-inch disk drive. In April 1984, Jonos introduced the C2600, a model in the Escort range that replaces the 5-MB Rodine hard drive unit of the 2500 with a 10-MB drive.

By August 1983, the company had sold between 100 and 500 units of the Courier 2100. In January 1984, Jonos, Ltd., reincorporated themselves as Jonos International, Inc., and began selling their products directly in the United Kingdom, with plans to expand into Africa, Asia, Australia, Europe, and Japan. The company had been selling their computers in England starting in June 1983, through their reseller Group N.H. By early 1984, Jonos relocated their American headquarters from Anaheim to Fullerton, California. By late 1984, the company employed 65 workers.

Jonos introduced their first computer compatible with the IBM PC in around March 1984. Called the Jonos 2150i, it featured an Intel 8088 and was optioned with either dual 3.5-inch floppy drives, dual 360-KB 5.25-inch floppy drives, or dual 1.2-MB 5.25-inch floppy drives. With a case made from rugged steel and weighing 31 pounds (14 kg), PC World remarked that it was "the B-17 of portable computers".

=== Rebranding and dissolution (1987–1992) ===
In June 1987, C. Norman Campbell, Jonos' vice president of engineering, acquired the company from Amos and reincorporated it as Netcom Research, Inc., in Fountain Valley, California. As Netcom, the company initially produced workstations based on the 80286, i386, and i486 processors from Intel. In July 1989, Netcom Research was acquired by the Phoenix Group, an investment company founded by Chuck Missler and based in Newport Beach, for less than $100,000. Netcom's first products under Phoenix's control were LAN expansion cards for the IBM PC and compatibles. In late September 1989, Netcom landed a $49 million contract to sell the company's LAN products through an international distributor.

In September 1989, Phoenix received worldwide attention when it signed a contract with the Soviet Union to provide the latter with three million personal computers in Soviet classrooms and three million more PCs in Soviet businesses. Netcom Research, as well as Phoenix's other computer manufacturing subsidiary, American P.C. Corporation, were to manufacture the computers; as well, Phoenix was to invest in the raising of computer factories in the Soviet Union, using Netcom and American P.C. as models. In April 1990, however, the Soviets cancelled the deal after becoming aware of Phoenix's tight cash reserves. Netcom Research filed for Chapter 11 bankruptcy in November 1990, followed by Phoenix themselves in December 1990. Netcom dissolved completely in 1992.
