= ICON: Quest for the Ring =

- Developer: Macrocom
- Publisher: Macrocom
- Platform: MS-DOS
- Release: 1984
- Genre: Action-adventure

ICON: Quest for the Ring is a 1984 computer game made by Rand E. Bohrer (producer) and Neal White III (programming) of Georgia-based software company Macrocom Inc. It is an overhead-view, sword and sorcery, dungeon adventure with real-time arcade action.

== Game ==
Unlike other dungeon adventures from the early days of home computers, there is not much RPG gameplay, only basic experience-building in the form of a vitality score (also displayed as a meter) which, in normal mode, increases its upper limit when you complete a level. There is also an inventory and small selection of weapons, armour and other items, including gold, though there are no shops or inns for spending.

There are seven levels and each is like a chapter of a book, beginning with a summary of what happened in the last chapter and an introduction to the next. There are also small, graphical depictions of the story throughout the game. The story is based on Richard Wagner's Der Ring des Nibelungen operas, themselves sourced from Germanic legends and follows the adventures of Siegmund and his son and successor Siegfried, involving the dwarf Alberich, the dragon Fafner and the magic ring of the Niebelungs. The title sequence is set to Wagner's Ride of the Valkyries (adapted for PC internal speakers), which also plays in between levels.

The rear box cover promotes the game as being similar to other adventure games e.g. killing monsters and picking up gold, but having a "spiritual dimension" to it and this is explained more in the manual. It concerns you, in the role of the hero Siegmund, being part of Odin's plan to kill the giant Fafner who, using the magic ring, has become a tyrant dragon, upsetting the balance of power. The story takes a tragic turn part-way through as other characters, both god and mortal, get involved. While killing the dragon is one of your main goals, more generally, you have to discover and fulfil your destiny, acting out your role in the story. As well as being like chapters of a book, each dungeon level is meant to be a lesson in one of seven virtues, each represented by an icon or symbol to be found somewhere in the dungeon. The game isn't always completely clear about what the mission is, but alerts you of completion with a distinctive, rising intonation. You can then advance by finding and moving into the flashing icon, the icon being a portal to the next dungeon (or the "higher world" where you'll be tested for a different virtue). However, if you are killed on your way to the icon portal, you still advance, this is described in the manual as being like a karmic reward from Odin for having lived the virtue of that stage, but you gain bonus points if you advance via the portal.

== Production ==
Producer Randall E. Bohrer earned a PhD in mythology from Yale University in 1976 and applied his knowledge to the design of the game. There was also a lot of technical computer knowledge applied e.g. Neal White's discovering how to simulate 300 x 200, 16-color graphics on the IBM CGA graphics card, supposed to allow only 4-color graphics, by using a tweaked 160 x 100, 16-color text mode that cut each character cell down to the top two pixel rows. IBM's enhanced EGA graphics card was only released in late 1984, around the same time as ICON, but their games-focused PCjr, with its superior graphic and sound capability, was released in March 1984. The ICON reference sheet specifically mentions support for PCjr as well as the Tandy 1000 PC, which came out at the end of the year with similarly superior graphics and sound, but ICON doesn't have alternate graphics or theme music for these computers. The reference sheet also has instructions on how to set an EGA card to compatibility mode. Neal White coded the game in MT+ Pascal programming language.

== Artwork ==
Tyler Strouth is credited in the manual for artwork. The front box artwork is signed "TYLER", as is one of the inside manual illustrations, while another is signed NWIII (Neal White III). The manual front cover though, is a reproduction of Albrecht Dürer's 1513 engraving "Knight, Death and the Devil".

== International release ==
The game was released in the UK by Status Software in February 1987 with new box art and all inside manual illustrations removed, except for the "cast of characters".

== Follow-up ==
Macrocom followed up with The Seven Spirits of Ra in 1987, published by Sir-Tech.
