= Thomson TO16 =

Early 1989 French microcomputer model

- Also known as: Thomson TO16PC
- Manufacturer: Thomson SA
- Released: 1987; 39 years ago
- Introductory price: 9000 to 16000 FF
- Operating system: MS-DOS 3.2
- CPU: Intel 8088 @ 4.77 or 9.54 MHz (turbo mode)
- Memory: 512 KB expandable to 768 KB
- Storage: 5¼-inch floppy discs
- Graphics: MDA, Hercules, CGA and Plantronics Colorplus compatible graphic card
- Sound: PC speaker
- Connectivity: RS-232, printer port
- Backward compatibility: IBM PC
- Related: Thomson TO16PCM, Thomson TO16XPDD, Thomson TO16XPHD

The Thomson TO16 or Thomson TO16PC is a PC compatible personal computer introduced by French company Thomson SA in 1987, with prices ranging from 9000 to 16000 FF depending on the version.

== Prototype ==
The original concept was a machine similar to the Macintosh. Based on this the Thomson TO16 prototype (codename Théodore) was built around a Motorola 68000 processor with an Intel 82716 graphics chipset. The operating system chosen was OS-9, a preemptive multitasking system similar to Unix. It also featured an integrated 20 MB SCSI hard drive.

Work on the prototype was carried on between 1985 and 1988, with five machines built. This concept was abandoned in favor of a PC compatible architecture, with the TO16 model designation being kept.

=== Specifications ===
- Motorola 68000 @ 8 MHz CPU
- 2 MB RAM
- Two video modes: 320×200 with 256 colors; 640×270 with 16 colors
- Mouse
- 3½-inch floppy drive
- 20 MB SCSI hard drive

== Thomson TO16 ==
The Thomson TO16 is a IBM PC compatible machine, running MS-DOS 3.2 with MS-DOS Manager and GW-BASIC. The CPU is an Intel 8088 capable of running at 9.54 MHz on turbo mode with 512 KB of RAM and a CGA graphic card with expanded abilities.

=== Specifications ===
- CPU Intel 8088 running at 4.77 or 9.54 MHz
- support for Intel 8087 co-processor
- 512 KB of RAM, expandable to 768 KB on the motherboard
- 32 KB of ROM
- IBM Monochrome Display Adapter, Hercules Graphics Card, CGA and Plantronics Colorplus compatible graphic card
- Internal 5¼-inch 360 KB disc drive
- Two ISA expansion slots
- Connections for an external disk drive
- RS-232C Serial and Centronics Parallel (micro ribbon connector) interfaces
- Optional modem

== Hardware versions ==
The original TO16 model was expanded into four variations by adding extra hardware, such as a modem or hard drive.

- Thomson TO16PC: original and most basic version
- Thomson TO16PCM: 2400 bauds modem
- Thomson TO16XPDD: two disc drives
- Thomson TO16XPHD: 20 MB hard drive, color monitor and EGA graphics
