= Plantronics Colorplus =

Graphics card for IBM PC computers

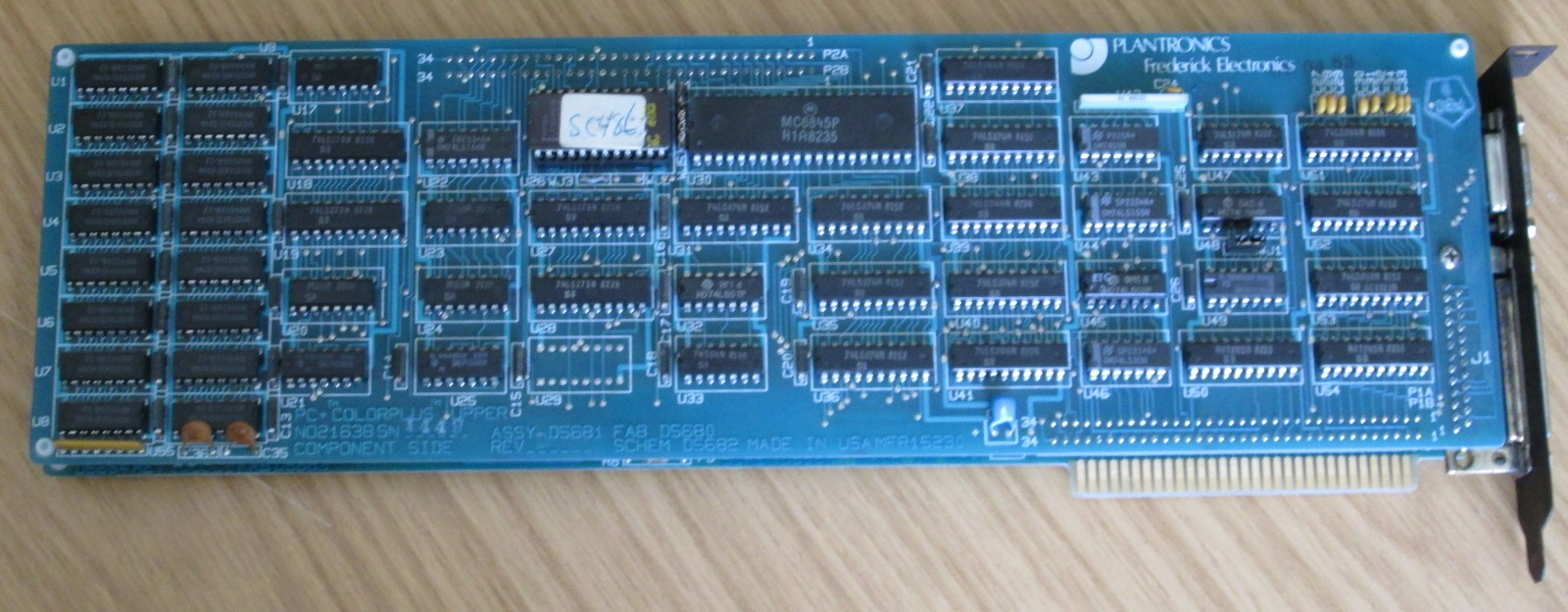
- Release date: 1982; 44 years ago
- Manufactured by: Plantronics Enhanced Graphics Products
- Designed by: Frederick Electronics
- Architecture: Motorola MC6845

Cards
- Entry-level: Plantronics Colorplus
- High-end: ATI Graphics Solution, Paradise AutoSwitch EGA 480

History
- Predecessor: CGA
- Successor: EGA

The Plantronics Colorplus is a graphics card for IBM PC computers, first sold in 1982. It implements a superset of the then-current CGA standard, using the same monitor standard (4-bit digital TTL RGBI monitor) and providing the same pixel resolutions. It was produced by Frederick Electronics (of Frederick, Maryland), a subsidiary of Plantronics since 1968, and sold by Plantronics' Enhanced Graphics Products division.

The Colorplus has twice the memory of a standard CGA board (32k, compared to 16k). The additional memory can be used in graphics modes to double the color depth, giving two additional graphics modes—16 colors at 320 × 200 resolution, or 4 colors at 640 × 200 resolution.

It uses the same Motorola MC6845 display controller as the previous MDA and CGA adapters.

The original card also includes a parallel printer port.

== Output capabilities ==
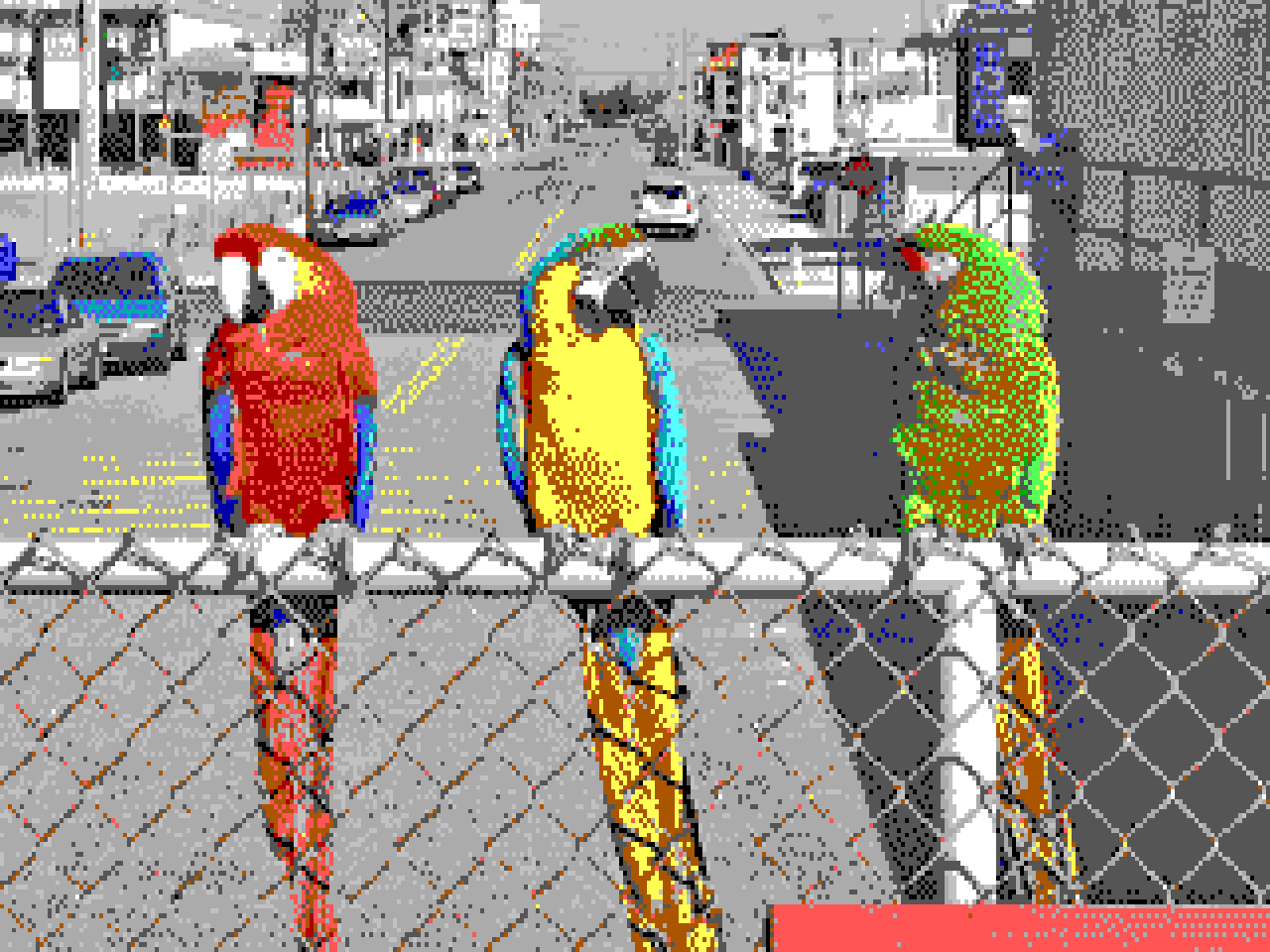
Plantronics 320 × 200 with 16 colors graphics resolution, corrected for aspect ratio

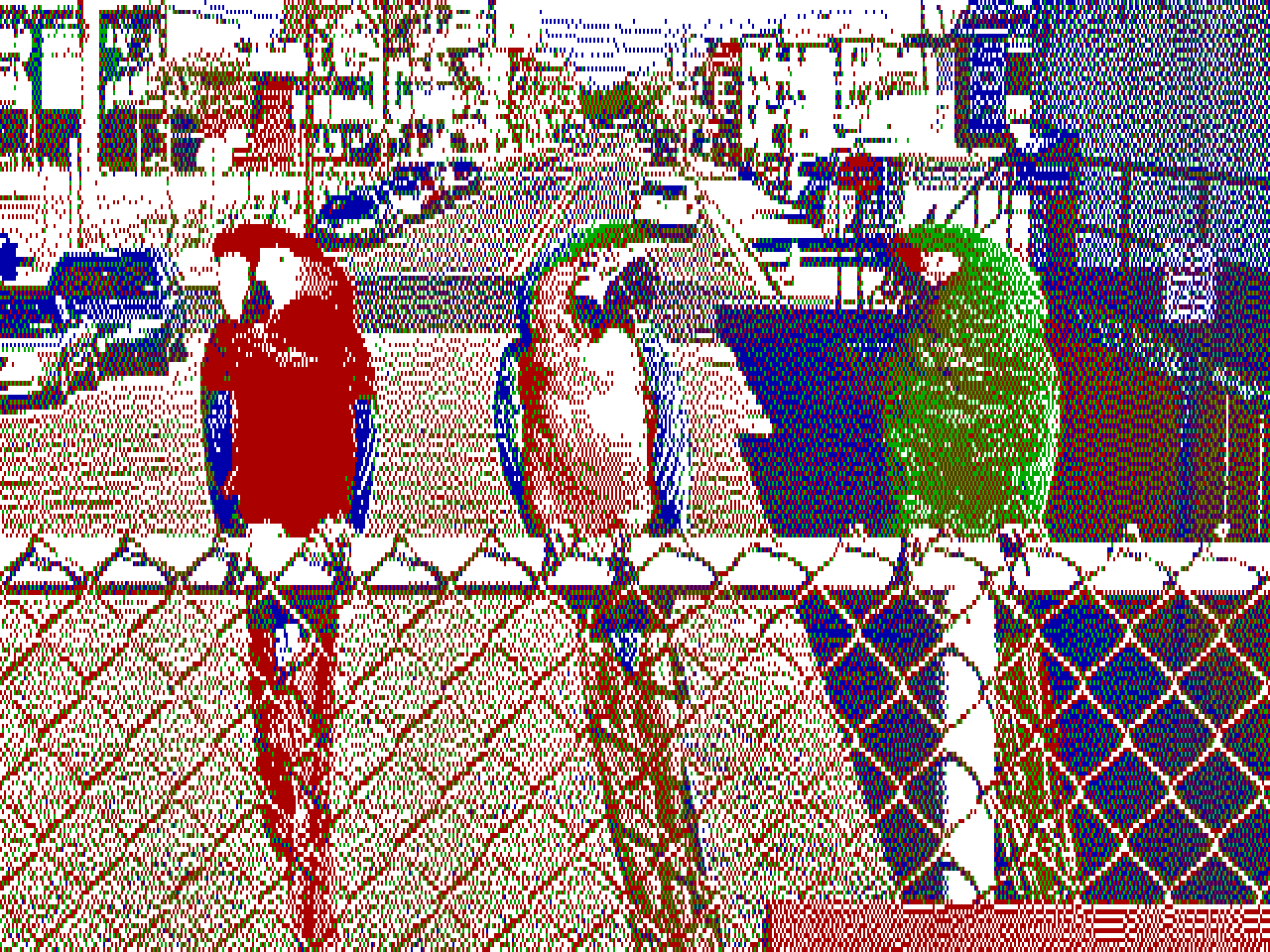
Plantronics 640 × 200 with 4 colors graphics resolution, corrected for aspect ratio

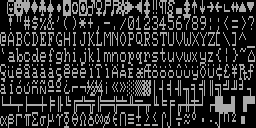
Code page 437 rendered in the "new" font

CGA compatible modes:

- 160 × 100 16 color mode (actual a text mode using , ▌, ▐ and █)
- 320 × 200 in 4 colors from a 16 color hardware palette. Pixel aspect ratio of 1:1.2.
- 640 × 200 in 2 colors. Pixel aspect ratio of 1:2.4
- 40 × 25 with 8 × 8 pixel font text mode (effective resolution of 320 × 200)
- 80 × 25 with 8 × 8 pixel font text mode (effective resolution of 640 × 200)

In addition to the CGA modes, it offers:

- 320 × 200 with 16 colors
- 640 × 200 with 4 colors
- "New high-resolution" text font, selectable by hardware jumper

The "new" font was actually the unused "thin" font already present in the IBM CGA ROMs, with 1-pixel wide vertical strokes. This offered greater clarity on RGB monitors, versus the default "thick" / 2-pixel font more suitable for output to composite monitors and over RF to televisions but, contrary to Plantronics' advertising claims, was drawn at the same 8 × 8 pixel resolution.

== Software support ==
Few software made use of the enhanced Plantronics modes, for which there was no BIOS support.

A 1984 advertisement listed the following software as compatible:

- Color-It
- UCSD P-system
- Peachtree Graphics Language
- Business Graphics System
- Graph Power
- The Draftsman
- Videogram
- Stock View
- GSX
- CompuShow (320 × 200 mode)

Some contemporary software has added support for Plantronics modes:

- Planet X3, released by American YouTuber David "The 8-Bit Guy" Murray in 2019, was the first video game known to have Colorplus support (320 × 200 with 16 colors). This support was added by Planet X3 enthusiast Benedikt Freisen.
- Attack of the Petscii Robots by American YouTuber David "The 8-Bit Guy" in 2020, ported to MS-DOS computers with a graphics mode providing support for Plantronics Plus.
- Benedikt Freisen produced updated drivers in 2021 that add Colorplus support to Sierra's adventure games that ran on Sierra's Creative Interpreter.
- FastDoom, a port of Doom (1993 video game) developed by Victor Nieto, added support for ColorPlus 320 × 200 with 16 colors mode in 2021.

== Hardware clones ==
Some third-party CGA and EGA clones, such as the ATI Graphics Solution and the Paradise AutoSwitch EGA 480, could emulate the extra modes (usually describing them simply as 'Plantronics mode').

The Thomson TO16 (a PC-XT compatible) and the Olivetti M19 supported Plantronics modes, along with CGA.

== See also ==
- Tandy Graphics Adapter, a graphics hardware system with similar capabilities.
- Quadram Quadcolor
- Orchid Graphics Adapter
- Hercules Graphics Card
- Olivetti M19
- Thomson TO16
