= The Seven Spirits of Ra =

1987 video game

- Developer: Macrocom
- Publisher: Sir-Tech
- Platform: MS-DOS
- Release: 1987
- Genre: Action-adventure

The Seven Spirits of Ra is an action-adventure game for MS-DOS set in ancient Egypt. It was developed by Macrocom and published by Sir-Tech in 1987.

== Description ==
The Seven Spirits of Ra is set in ancient Egypt. It is the sequel to ICON: Quest for the Ring, a similar video game by Macrocom in a medieval setting.

== Gameplay ==
The Seven Spirits of Ra is a game in which the player is the Egyptian god Osiris, whose spirit must collect the seven spirits of Ra to return to life. The game involves navigating eight areas, each filled with enemies, traps, and puzzles. The player must defeat specific animals to gain their transformative powers, allowing access to new areas and solving puzzles. Resource management and combat are crucial, with limited weapons and health regeneration. The game culminates in a final battle against Set, requiring strategic use of transformations and combat skills.

== Reception ==
Alan Roberts of Computer Gaming World stated in 1988 that The Seven Spirits of Ra was an alternative for those "tired of generic pseudo-medieval fantasy games". He concluded, "Even though the game is not as tough as it should be, the game is worthy of an above average recommendation and it must be given an extremely strong recommendation for arcade addicts and teachers".
