= Visi On =

Operating environment program

- Visi On Applications Manager
- Developer: VisiCorp
- Working state: Discontinued
- Source model: Proprietary
- Initial release: December 16, 1983; 42 years ago
- Latest release: 1.01 / Currently unknown
- License: Proprietary

Visi On (also known as VisiOn) is an operating environment for MS-DOS, developed by VisiCorp and released in December 1983. Visi On was the first software with a graphical user interface (GUI) for the IBM PC. It was also one of the first GUIs available on any personal computer. Visi On was never popular, as it had steep minimum system requirements for its day, but it was influential in the development of later GUIs like Windows.

VisiCorp had programs for sale that were compatible with VisiOn, including a spreadsheet program called "VisiOn Calc" (not to be confused with VisiCalc).

One of Visi On's features was an hourglass cursor that indicated when the system was loading data from a disk. At the time, most software would display words on the screen like "busy" or "please wait" instead.

== History ==
=== Background ===
In the spring of 1981, Personal Software was cash-flush from the ever-increasing sales of VisiCalc, and the corporate directors sat down and planned out their future directions. Ed Esber introduced the concept of a "family" of products that could be sold together, but from a technical perspective none of their products were similar in anything but name. For instance, to use VisiPlot with VisiCalc data, the numbers to be plotted had to be exported in a "raw" format and then re-imported.

Dan Fylstra led a technical discussion on what sorts of actions the user would need to be able to accomplish in order for their products to be truly integrated. They decided that there were three key concepts. One was universal data exchange, which would be supported by a set of common data structures used in all of their programs. Another was a common, consistent interface so users would not have to re-learn the UI as they moved from one program to another. Finally, Fylstra was concerned that the time needed to move from one program to another was too long to be useful – a user needing to quickly look something up in VisiDex would have to save and exit VisiCalc, look up the information, and then quit that and re-launch VisiCalc again. This process had to be made quicker and simpler.

=== Creation ===
In July 1981, Xerox announced the Xerox Star, an advanced workstation computer featuring a graphical user interface (GUI), and by that point it was known that Apple Computer was working on a lower-cost computer with a GUI that would later be released as the Apple Lisa. Personal Software's president, Terry Opdendyk, knew of a two-man team in Texas that was working on a GUI, and arranged for those men: Scott Warren and Dennis Abbe to visit Personal Software's headquarters in Sunnyvale, California. They demonstrated a version of the Smalltalk programming language running on the TRS-80 microcomputer, a seriously underpowered machine for the task. Personal Software was extremely impressed.

A contract was soon signed, and work on project "Quasar" started almost immediately. The name was shortly thereafter changed to Visi On, a play on "vision" that retained their "Visi" naming. An experimental port to the Apple III was completed in November, and after that, development work shifted to the DEC VAX, which had cross-compilers for a number of different machines. In early 1982 Personal Software changed their name to VisiCorp, and was betting much of the future success of the company on Visi On.

Visi On had many features of a modern GUI, and included a few that did not become common until many years later. It was fully mouse-driven, used a bit-mapped display for both text and graphics, included on-line help, and allowed the user to open a number of programs at once, each in its own window. Visi On did not, however, include a graphical file manager. Visi On also demanded a hard drive in order to implement its virtual memory system used for "fast switching", and at the time hard drives were very expensive.

Shortly after Apple introduced the Lisa, VisiCorp announced that it was developing Visi On.

In an interview before the launch of the original Macintosh, Steve Jobs claimed that neither VisiOn nor Microsoft's Windows would be the standard windowing software on IBM PCs, instead saying that IBM's own windowing software would become the standard.

=== COMDEX demo ===
Tom Towers, VisiCorp's new VP of marketing, pushed for the system to be demonstrated at the fall COMDEX show in 1982. Others in the company were worried that the product was not ready for shipping, and that showing it so early would leave potential customers and distributors upset if it wasn't ready soon after. Another concern was that VisiWord was being released at the same show, and there was some worry that it might be lost in the shuffle.

The demonstrations at COMDEX were a huge success. Many viewers had to be told it was not simply a movie they were watching, and Bill Gates speculated that the PC was in fact simply a terminal for a "real" machine like a VAX. It became one of the most talked-about products in the industry. However this huge success led to a number of very serious problems.

In separate June and July 1983 Byte articles, the company mentioned a late summer 1983 release.

=== Corporate civil war ===
While Visi On development continued, VisiCorp as an entity was in the process of self-destruction. Terry Opdendyk, the president hand-picked by the early venture capital investors, had an extremely autocratic management style that led to the departure of many key executives. From late 1981 to the eventual release of Visi On, most of the product management of the company left, notably Mitch Kapor in charge of VisiCalc development, Ed Esber, Roy Folk, Visi On's product marketing manager, among others. This was referred to as "corporate civil war".

It was Mitch Kapor's departure that would prove most devastating to the company, however. Kapor, developer of VisiPlot and VisiTrend, had been pressing for the development of a greatly improved spreadsheet to succeed VisiCalc, but Opdendyk was uninterested. This was during a time when VisiCorp and VisiCalc's developers were at an impasse, and VisiCalc was growing increasingly outdated. When Kapor decided to leave, the other executives pressed for a clause forbidding Kapor to work on an "integrated spreadsheet", but Opdendyk couldn't be bothered, exclaiming "Kapor is a spaghetti programmer", denigrating his abilities.

Kapor would go on to release Lotus 1-2-3, which became a major competitor to VisiCalc in 1983. By the end of the year, sales had been cut in half. Combined with the exodus of major portions of the senior executive staff and the ongoing battle with VisiCalc's developers, VisiCorp was soon in serious financial difficulty. All hopes for the company's future were placed on Visi On.

The October 31, 1983 InfoWorld, in an article titled, "Finally, Visi On is here," flatly stated: "the... publisher is putting the product on computer store shelves... Visi On was scheduled to be available during the last week in October". The November 14, 1983 issue said: "VisiCorp has just released Visi On." However, the July 2, 1984 issue says: "By the time Visi On was actually shipped on December 16, 1983,..." and PC Magazine reported in the February 7, 1984 issue that they still hadn't received the product in its commercially available form.

== Release ==
The operating system, known as the Visi On Applications Manager, was released in December 1983 and sold for US$495 (equivalent to $1,600 in 2025), with a mouse sold separately for another $250.

=== Reception ===
The main disadvantage of Visi On was its extremely high system requirements by 1983 standards. It needed 512 kilobytes of RAM and a hard disk at a time when PCs shipped with 64k-128k. IBM did not yet offer a hard disk with the PC when Visi On was first demoed (IBM's first model with a hard drive, the PC XT, didn't ship until March 1983). Third-party drives were however available at the time, typically 5 MB units that connected to the floppy controller and were treated by the operating system as an oversized floppy disk (there was no subdirectory support). This brought the total cost of running Visi On to $7500, three-quarters the cost of the Apple Lisa.

The press continued to laud the product, going so far as to claim it represented the end of operating systems. The end-users were less impressed, however, not only due to the high cost of the required hardware, but also the general slowness of the system. In a market where computers were generally used for only one or two tasks, usually business related, the whole purpose of Visi On was seriously diluted.

In January 1984, Apple Computer released the Macintosh with much fanfare. Although the Macintosh was seriously lacking software, it was faster, cheaper, and included one feature Visi On lacked: a graphical file manager (the Finder). Although it didn't compete directly with Visi On, which was really a "PC product", it nevertheless demonstrated that a GUI could indeed be fast and relatively inexpensive, both of which Visi On failed to deliver.

Adding to the release's problems was Bill Gates, who took a page from VisiCorp's book and announced that their own product, Microsoft Windows, would be available in May 1984. This muddied the waters significantly, notably when he further claimed it would have a similar feature set, didn't require a hard disk, and cost only $250. Windows was released with an even longer delay than Visi On, shipping in November 1985, and was lacking the features that forced Visi On to demand a hard drive.

=== End of life ===
Only eight VisiCorp employees were still developing Visi On when VisiCorp sold the source code to Control Data in mid-1984 to raise cash as it sued Software Arts, while continuing to sell the software itself. Sales were apparently very slow; in February 1985, VisiCorp responded by lowering the price of the basic OS to $99, knowing that anyone purchasing it would also need to buy the applications. These were bundled, all three for $990. This improved the situation somewhat, but sales were still far below projections, and it was certainly not helping the company stave off the problems due to Lotus 1-2-3.

Following declining VisiCalc sales and low revenues from Visi On, in November 1985, the company merged with Paladin Software. The new company kept the Paladin name. VisiCorp, and its line of "VisiProducts", were history.

== Technical information ==
Official system requirements for Visi On were:

1. 512K of User Memory
2. RS-232 Serial Port
3. 5 Megabyte Hard Disk (FAT12 file system )
4. 1 Floppy Disk Drive, DS/DD, 40 Track, 48 tpi
5. VisiCorp Mouse (Mouse Systems-compatible mice)
6. MS-DOS 2.0
7. Graphics Adapter compatible with CGA 640x200 monochrome mode
8. Computer monitor capable of displaying CGA 640x200

It will work on newer PCs, but requires a compatible mouse and hard disk partition under 15MB as only the FAT12 file system is supported. In addition, as it revectors some IRQs used by PC/ATs and later, VISIONXT.EXE requires modifications which prevent Graph and other applications from functioning properly.

Visi On required Mouse Systems-compatible mice; Microsoft-compatible PC mice, which over time became the standard, were introduced later (in May 1983). Visi On used two mouse drivers. First, loaded in text mode, made mouse registers accessible to the embedded driver, which translated coordinates to cursor position. This internal driver, built-in as a subroutine into VISIONXT.EXE, required Mouse Systems PC-Mouse pointing device. It is not compatible with the Microsoft Mouse standard.

Writing Visi On applications required a Unix development environment. Visi On was targeted toward high-end (expensive) PC workstations. Visi On applications were written in a subset of C VisiC, and a third-party could have ported the core software (VisiHost, VisiMachine virtual machine, VISIONXT.EXE in IBM PC DOS version) to Unix, but that never occurred. In 1984, VisiCorp's assets were sold off to Control Data Corporation.

Making working copies of the original floppy disks using modern methods is difficult - they are protected using pre-created bad sectors and other methods of floppy disk identification.
