= Peter R. Jennings =

British-Canadian scientist and software developer

- Born: 1950 (age 75–76); Bedford, England, United Kingdom
- Education: SUNY Stony Brook University (MA in physics); McMaster University (MBA)
- Years active: 1970–present
- Known for: MicroChess
- Notable work: MicroChess; ChessMate; VisiCorp

Peter R. Jennings (born 1950) is a British-Canadian physicist, scientist, inventor, software developer, computer chess programmer, and entrepreneur. He is most notable for creating MicroChess, the first microcomputer game to be sold commercially.

== Biography ==
=== Early life ===
Peter Jennings was born in Bedford, England, in 1950. In the 1960s his family moved to Ontario, Canada. He received his Master of Arts (MA) degree in physics from SUNY Stony Brook University in 1972 and his Master of Business Administration (MBA) in finance and marketing from McMaster University in 1974.

=== MicroChess and ChessMate ===
Jennings developed MicroChess shortly after leaving graduate school in New York. It was the first software to ever sell over 10,000 copies. The code was sold on paper and users had to manually enter the program using a keyboard.

The program was later available on Apple II, TRS-80, Commodore PET, and Atari 8-bit computers, where it sold millions of copies. Jennings also developed the first model of the ChessMate while working for Commodore in 1977.

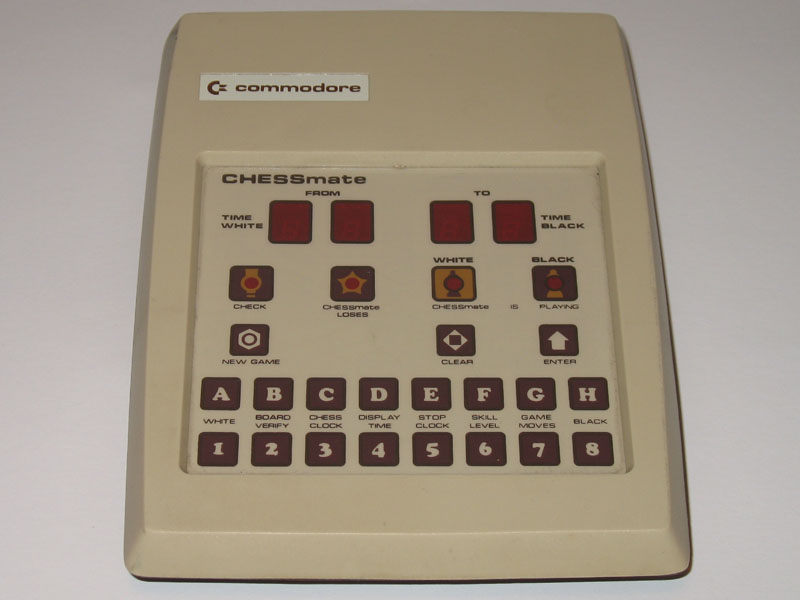
The Commodore ChessMate, developed by Peter R. Jennings in 1977

=== Later years ===
In 1976, along with Dan Fylstra, Jennings co-founded the corporation Personal Software, which later became VisiCorp. Proceeds from MicroChess sales helped finance the development of VisiCalc, the first-ever spreadsheet program.

== Publications ==
- January 1978: "The Second World Computer Chess Championships". BYTE. p. 108.
- March 1978: "Microchess 1.5 vs. Dark Horse". BYTE. p. 166.
- 1979: "Revolution in Personal Computing". Wharton Magazine.
- No date: "A Good, Long Read (for 18 Years)". Foundation RISC User Online. RISCOS Ltd.
