= Microchess =

1976 computer chess software

- Microchess on a KIM-1 microcomputer
- Developer: Peter R. Jennings
- Publisher: Micro-Ware / Personal Software
- Platforms: KIM-1, Altair 8800, Apple II, Atari 8-bit, PET, TRS-80, TRS-80 Color Computer
- Release: December 18, 1976
- Genre: Computer chess

Microchess, sometimes written as MicroChess, is a chess program developed for the MOS Technology KIM-1 microcomputer by Peter R. Jennings in 1976, and published by his company Micro-Ware. The game plays chess against the human player at a beginner level, with the player entering moves via a keyboard and the computer responding, both in a custom chess notation. The game was ported to many other microcomputers such as the TRS-80, Apple II, Commodore PET, and Atari 8-bit computers by Micro-Ware and its successor company Personal Software (later VisiCorp) between 1976 and 1980, with later versions featuring graphics and more levels of play. A dedicated hardware version of the game called ChessMate was produced by Commodore International in 1978, and the game's engine was licensed to Novag for its dedicated Chess Champion Mk II chess computer in 1979.

The game was created by Jennings over the course of around six months in 1976. He developed it with the aim of making a product that could be widely sold, rather than as the most advanced chess engine possible. It was possibly the first computer game to be sold commercially, and was the first commercial chess program for microcomputers and the first software package to sell 50,000 copies. Micro-Ware itself was possibly the first software publishing company. Microchess ultimately sold over a million copies across all of its versions by the mid-1980s, and variants were sold into the early 1990s. Despite being commercially successful, it has been largely regarded by critics as a poor chess game.

== Gameplay ==
Microchess is a chess program that allows the user to play against a low-level computer opponent. Earlier versions of the game did not have video output: the player would use the keyboard to enter moves using a custom notation, and the program would provide its replies using the same notation. Later versions of the game for other microcomputers have visual outputs of the chess board. The program can run at one of three speeds: Respond instantly, after calculating for 5–10 seconds, or use enough time that a full game may last an hour. While calculating its move, it looks up to three plies ahead. It has been estimated to have the strength of a beginning player, at around 1100 Elo.

== Development ==
Microchess was developed by Peter R. Jennings in Toronto, Canada in 1976. Jennings had wanted to create a chess program for many years after reading a Scientific American article on the subject. Upon reading an article about MOS Technology's new KIM-1 microcomputer, Jennings decided to buy one and try writing his own program. His intention during development was to create a game he could sell—first for the KIM-1, and then for other microcomputers—rather than to design the best possible chess engine.

Jennings began work on the game in May 1976. Within weeks, he had a program that could play chess against a human player. Over the next six months, he continued to iterate on the game, improving the computer's ability to understand moves and strategy while working within the KIM-1's limitations, including its 1kB of memory. In 1976, the KIM-1 also lacked both a video display and a full keyboard. The game was designed such that players would input their moves using a custom notation, and the computer would respond with the notation for its own moves printed on a small seven-segment display, with the player possibly making use of a physical chess board to keep track of the game. A friend of fellow KIM-1 owner Jim Butterfield was the first human that Microchess defeated. A short announcement by Butterfield previewing the game appeared in KIM-1 User Notes in November 1976. Despite the newsletter not mentioning Jennings's contact information, he received calls and letters from enthusiasts asking when the game would be complete. That same month, an incomplete version of the game was demonstrated at a trade show by MOS Technology. The game was completed in December.

== Release ==
Graphical Microchess 1.5 on a TRS-80 microcomputer

Jennings released Microchess on December 18, 1976, and sent announcements of the game to hobbyist magazines and catalogues. On April 1, 1977, he founded Micro-Ware for the purpose of selling the game. Initial sales of Microchess were not of the program on a cassette tape, but were instead a printed booklet of computer code which the player would need to type into the computer to write the program and then save it to their own tape. According to Jennings this was because he was working at another job and did not have time to make copies of tapes to sell, as it was a difficult process at the time. Additionally, there was no commercial software market and most programs were distributed via printed source code in books and magazines to computer enthusiasts, the target audience of the game. After a couple of months, Micro-Ware began selling paper tapes and cassette tapes of the program directly and through distributors, though the source code to the game was still included in the manual. Microchess was sold for $10 per copy, in either US or Canadian currency; $12 for a copy that included a paper tape; and $13 for a copy on cassette tape.

Chuck Peddle, president of MOS Technology, offered to buy the rights to the game for $1,000, but Jennings refused to sell, believing his mail-order sales would make more. The game was widely sold for KIM-1 computers, partially due to MOS Technology including advertisements for the game with the computer. Reportedly some sales of the computer were specifically to play the game; according to Jennings, the price of the computer plus the game was similar to that of Fidelity Electronics's Chess Challenger (1977), the first dedicated chess computer. Versions of Microchess were released for other microcomputers in 1977, with minimal changes as Jennings was not interested in improving the program, only selling it more widely. A version for the Altair 8800 was produced in April 1977, with the port done by Terry O'Brian, a member of the local Toronto computer club. For that and later versions the source code was no longer printed in the manual as it was much longer than it had been for the KIM-1.

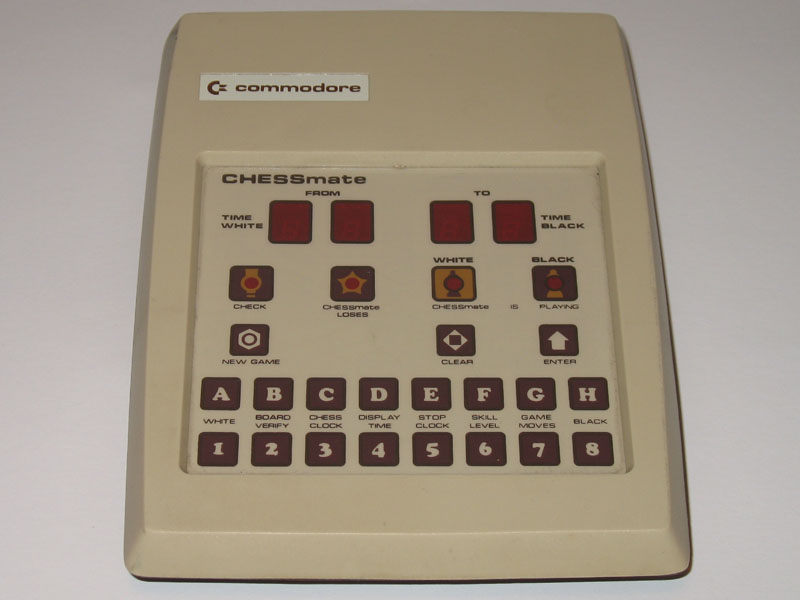
Commodore ChessMate

In 1978, Jennings and Micro-Ware produced an improved, dedicated chess computer version of the game, ChessMate, which was produced by Commodore International. The game's engine was also licensed to Novag for its dedicated Chess Champion Mk II in 1979. Former World Chess Champion Bobby Fischer met with Jennings, and played against ChessMate. He considered licensing his name for the product, but ultimately decided against it. That same year, version 1.5 was released for the TRS-80, as well as version 2.0 for the Apple II, Commodore PET, and Atari 8-bit computers, both of which included black-and-white graphics of a chessboard. Other features added in these versions included multiple levels of play, with 1.5 having three levels, and 2.0 having eight. Brad Templeton created the user interface for the PET and Atari versions, while Andy Kamienski worked on the TRS-80 version, all using Jennings's chess engine. A final version of Microchess with color graphics was released for the TRS-80 Color Computer in 1980. As the successor to Micro-Ware, Personal Software, did not deal with computer games at the time, Jennings created the port himself; it uses the version 2.0 engine, the last version he had written.

== Reception ==
Microchess was a major success for the late 1970s computer market. According to Jennings, it was the first computer game to be sold commercially, while video game and computer historians have termed it the first "commercially sold home computer game", the first commercial computer game "not released by a hardware company" and the first commercial chess program for microcomputers. Over 1,000 copies of the game were sold by mid-1977, leading Jennings to quit his job and run Micro-Ware full-time after coming home one day and finding two bags of mail filled with orders for Microchess. The game's success grew as Jennings released it for more sophisticated and user-friendly computers than the KIM-1. The game made Micro-Ware over $1 million by 1978, and was claimed in 1981 by Personal Software to have been the first computer program of any kind to do so. It sold 50,000 copies by 1979, also claimed by Personal Software to be the first software product to do so, and according to Jennings at one point copies of Microchess had been sold to 30% of computer owners in existence. The majority of the copies sold in the 1970s were for the TRS-80; RadioShack ordered 20000 cassettes from Micro-Ware. ChessMate also sold tens of thousands of copies. Over one million copies of the game in its various versions were sold by the mid-1980s, and the TRS-80 color chess version was sold into the early 1990s.

According to Jennings, many buyers of the game did not know how to play chess nor were interested in learning, but were instead interested in having software that had a real-world analogue to show people. As the commercial video game industry was only beginning, Microchess did not receive reviews like more recent video games, and its ability to play chess and thus interest among chess players was quickly surpassed by games such as Sargon (1978). BYTE in 1981 wrote that when chess programs such as Microchess appeared, "we all laughed and proceeded to demolish them ... microcomputer chess programs had a poor reputation". Chess player and historian Tim Harding, in a 1985 book on chess computers, called Microchess "dreadful" and vastly inferior to Sargon II (1979). Jennings did not disagree with criticism of the game's skill: "I still think that part of the commercial success of Microchess was that it was beatable and made stupid mistakes, just like an amateur human player. It was fun to play and win or lose".

== Legacy ==
Microchess led to the creation of Micro-Ware, possibly the first software publishing company. In 1978, Micro-Ware merged with software publisher Personal Software, operated by Dan Fylstra, who had seen the game at the November 1976 show and bought the third-ever sold copy, with Fylstra and Jennings as co-owners. The resulting company, still named Personal Software, paid royalties to Jennings for Microchess, but Jennings soon funneled that money into funding the development of VisiCalc (1979), the first spreadsheet software. This led the company to rebrand as VisiCorp in 1982.

Chuck Peddle later said that Microchess was a critical success for the KIM-1, and that it and Jennings were crucial to successfully launching the Commodore PET in 1977. As the source code was included with the game, Jennings encouraged players to write their own additions to the program. He claims that most additions were for supporting additional input or output types or adding the ability to recognize more chess openings than the limited memory of the base KIM-1 had allowed, and that no bugs or mistakes in the code were ever found. Jennings later noted that Micro-Ware sold many more early copies of the game for the KIM-1 than for the Altair 8800 microcomputers, despite the latter being much more popular. He attributes this to the more popular microcomputers having hobbyist clubs that shared software, while less popular microcomputer owners all had to purchase their own copies.

Jennings stopped playing chess for many years: "Programming Microchess actually ruined my game because I was paying so much attention to what the computer was doing, and since it was for testing, I was avoiding taking advantage of the weak parts of the algorithm. It changed the way of my own thinking".

== Sources ==
- "Oral History of Peter Jennings". Computer History Museum. February 1, 2005.
- Bagnall, Brian (2006). On the Edge: The Spectacular Rise and Fall of Commodore. Variant Press. ISBN 978-0-9738649-0-8.
- Freiberger, Paul; Swaine, Michael (1984). Fire in the Valley: The Making of the Personal Computer. Osborne/McGraw-Hill. ISBN 0-88134-121-5.
- Harding, Tim (1985). Price, Jill; Levy, David N. L. (eds.). The New Chess Computer Book. Pergamon Chess Series (2nd ed.). Pergamon Press. ISBN 978-1-4831-4032-2.
- Smith, Alexander (2019). They Create Worlds: The Story of the People and Companies That Shaped the Video Game Industry, Vol. I: 1971-1982. CRC Press. ISBN 978-0-429-75261-2.
- Stanton, Jeffrey; Dickey, John (1981). The Book of Apple Computer Software 1982. Book Company.
- Welsh, Theresa; Welsh, David (2007). Priming the Pump: How TRS-80 Enthusiasts Helped Spark the PC Revolution. The Seeker Books. ISBN 978-0-9793468-1-1.
- Zhouxiang, Lu (2022). A History of Competitive Gaming. Routledge. ISBN 978-1-00-058853-8.
