= Castle Adventure =

Freeware adventure game

- Developer: Kevin Bales
- Publisher: Freeware
- Platform: MS-DOS
- Release: 1984
- Genre: Adventure
- Mode: Single-player

Castle Adventure is a freeware adventure game designed by Kevin Bales and released in 1984. It was also illegally included in Keypunch's Swords and Sorcery under the title Golden Wombat. It uses ASCII characters to display a castle map and moving creatures. It is compiled from Microsoft BASIC. The source code has never been released.

== Plot ==
Castle Adventure is a dungeon crawl with little backstory. The second screen of the game displays: "You are trapped in a deserted castle and you must escape. It is rumored that the castle is full of treasures. Can you find them all?"

== Gameplay ==
In the castle courtyard

The player interacts with the environment through a mix of keyboard controls and a text parser. Items visible on the screen can be picked up by guiding the adventurer over them. For items not on the screen, the player needs to type commands such as: get diamond.

In order to defeat and defend against monsters, the adventurer must possess a sword. Fighting in Castle Adventure consists of directing the adventurer into a monster. Though it is not visibly recorded, combatants can sustain only a finite amount of damage, after which either the monster or the adventurer dies (as appropriate).

To complete the game, the adventurer must open a gate in the room from which the game begins, freeing themselves from the castle.

== Development ==
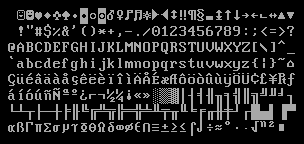
Characters of code page 437

The game uses the text mode of IBM PC compatibles. It uses special characters from code page 437 to represent monsters, treasures, weapons, props, castle walls, etc. It could be played on even the earliest IBM PC display equipment, such as the IBM Monochrome Display Adapter and the IBM 5151 monitor.

== Reception ==
Home of the Underdogs called the game as "one of the most memorable ASCII games of the bygone BBS era". DOSGames.com noted that the game "is nostalgically remembered by gamers who played it in the DOS era" while giving it 2.5 stars out of five and concluding that "the game itself is rather average, but it does include action and adventure elements, although there is very little plot".
