= Software Arts =

American software company, 1979 to 1985

- Company type: Private
- Industry: Software
- Founded: 1979
- Headquarters: Cambridge, Massachusetts, Newton, Massachusetts
- Key people: Co-founders Dan Bricklin, Bob Frankston
- Products: VisiCalc, TK/Solver, Spotlight

Software Arts was a software company founded by Dan Bricklin and Bob Frankston in 1979 to develop VisiCalc, which was published by a separate company, Personal Software Inc., later named VisiCorp.

Software Arts also developed TK!Solver, a numeric equation solving system developed originally by Milos Konopasek, and Spotlight, "a desktop organizer program for the IBM Personal Computer."

By early 1984 InfoWorld estimated that Software Arts was the world's 13th-largest microcomputer-software company, with $12 million in 1983 sales. It was bought by the company Lotus in 1985.
