= VisiCorp =

Early computer company

- Founded: 1977 Massachusetts
- Founders: Dan Fylstra, Peter R. Jennings

VisiCorp, originally Personal Software, was an early personal computer software publisher. Its most famous products were Microchess, Visi On and VisiCalc.

== History ==
Personal Software was founded in 1977 by Dan Fylstra. In 1978, it merged with Peter R. Jennings's Toronto-based software publisher Micro-Ware, with the two taking a 50% ownership each in the resulting company and Personal Software becoming the name of the combined company. It continued to publish the software from its original constituents, including Jennings' Microchess program for the MOS Technology KIM-1 computer, and later Commodore PET, Apple II, TRS-80, and Atari 8-bit computers. In 1979 it published the very successful VisiCalc developed by Software Arts, and in 1980 received outside investment from Arthur Rock and Venrock. That year management decided to focus on business applications, and shifted from mail order to regional software distributors and direct sales. Two thirds of revenue came from direct sales, and one third from contract or OEM sales. In May 1981 the company began advertising other software with the "Visi" name, such as VisiDex, VisiFile, and VisiWord. As of February 1983 It sold VisiCalc directly to dealers and through distributors, as well as OEMs such as Apple Computer, IBM, and Tandy Corporation. In 1982 the company was renamed VisiCorp Personal Software, Inc. Its Visi On was the first GUI for the IBM PC.

Bill Gates came to see Visi On at a trade show, and this seems to be what inspired him to create a windowed GUI for Microsoft. VisiCorp was larger than Microsoft at the time, and the two companies entered negotiations to merge, but could not agree on who would sit on the board of directors. Microsoft Windows when it was released included a wide range of drivers, so it could run on many different PCs, while Visi On cost more, and had stricter system requirements. Microsoft eventually released its own spreadsheet Microsoft Excel.

Early alumni of this company included Ed Esber, who would later run Ashton-Tate; Mitch Kapor, founder of Lotus Development; Rich Melman, who would co-found Electronic Arts; Bill Coleman, who would found BEA Systems; Bruce Wallace, author of Asteroids in Space; and Brad Templeton, who would found early dot-com company ClariNet and was the director of the Electronic Frontier Foundation from 2000 to 2010.

Kapor's company released Lotus 1-2-3 in January 1983; by March it was the best-selling business software. VisiCalc sales peaked in January and declined. VisiCorp agreed in 1979 to pay 36–50% of VisiCalc revenue to Software Arts, compared to typical software royalties of 10-15% by 1984. It composed 70% of VisiCorp revenue in 1982 and 58% in 1983. By 1984 InfoWorld stated that although VisiCorp's $43 million in 1983 sales made it the world's fifth-largest microcomputer-software company, it was "a company under siege" with "rapidly declining" VisiCalc sales and mediocre Visi On sales. The company had done little advertising—one expert said that VisiCorp had sold 700,000 copies of VisiCalc on word of mouth—and could not compete against 1-2-3. The magazine wrote that "VisiCorp's auspicious climb and subsequent backslide will no doubt become a How Not To primer for software companies of the future, much like Osborne Computer's story has become the How Not To for the hardware industry."

VisiCorp sued Software Arts in September 1983; the lawsuit and countersuit focused on the VisiCalc trademark. The two companies settled in September 1984; VisiCorp paid $500,000 in royalties to Software Arts, which received the VisiCalc trademark but not rights to the "Visi" prefix. VisiCorp could continue to use "Visi" with other software. By then VisiCorp was losing money because of continuing declining VisiCalc sales, and poor Visi On sales. Terry Opdendyk resigned as president in July 1984, and the company sold Visi On's technology and other assets to Control Data. In November 1984 it began merger plans with Paladin Software, founded by former employee Roy Folk. Although VisiCorp was the surviving company, it took the Paladin name because of VisiCorp's difficulties.
