= IBM Monochrome Display Adapter =

IBM PC graphic adapter and display standard

Monochrome Display Adapter
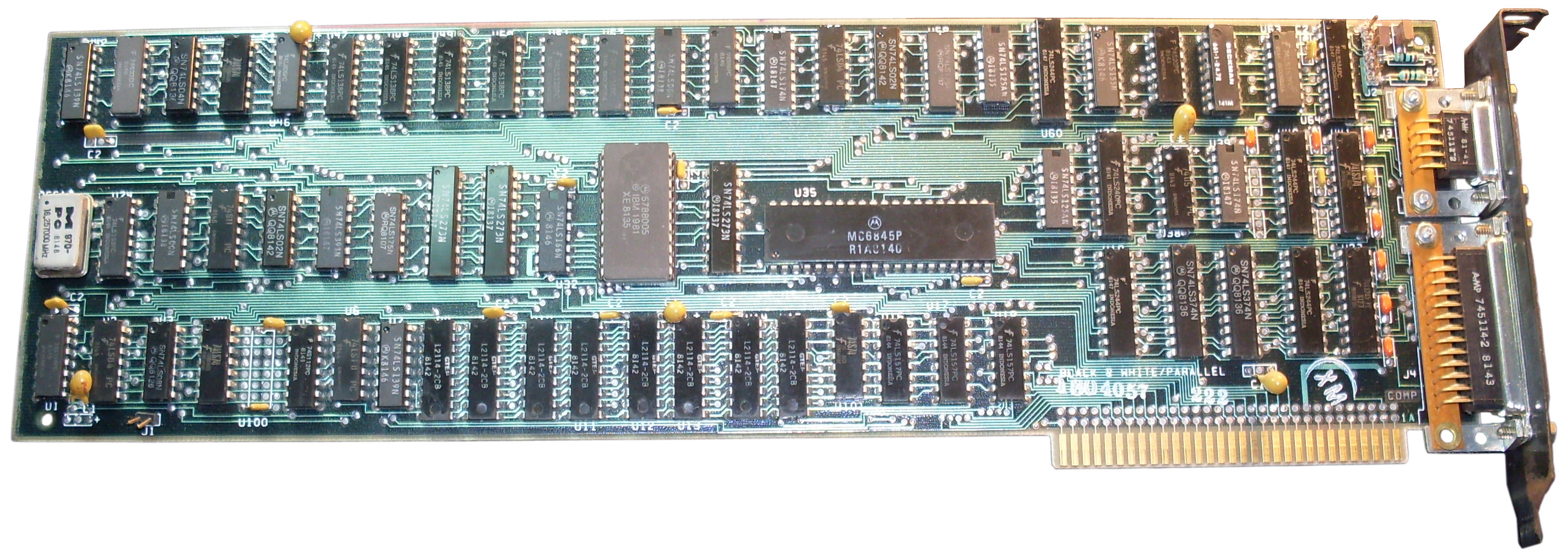
- IBM PC original MDA and parallel printer adapter
- Release date: 1981; 45 years ago
- Discontinued: 1984
- Architecture: Motorola 6845

Cards
- Entry-level: IBM MDA, Control Systems Artist 1, Hitachi HD6845SP, UMC UM6845

History
- Successor: Hercules Graphics Card, Enhanced Graphics Adapter

The Monochrome Display Adapter (MDA, also MDA card, Monochrome Display and Printer Adapter, MDPA) is IBM's standard video display card and computer display standard for the IBM PC introduced in 1981. The MDA does not have any pixel-addressable graphics modes, only a single monochrome text mode which can display 80 columns by 25 lines of high-resolution text characters or symbols useful for drawing forms.

== Hardware design ==
The original IBM MDA was an 8-bit ISA card with a Motorola 6845 display controller, 4 KB of RAM, a DE-9 output port intended for use with an IBM monochrome monitor. A parallel port for attachment of a printer is also included, avoiding the need to purchase a separate card.

== Capabilities ==
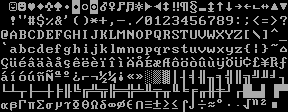
Characters of code page 437

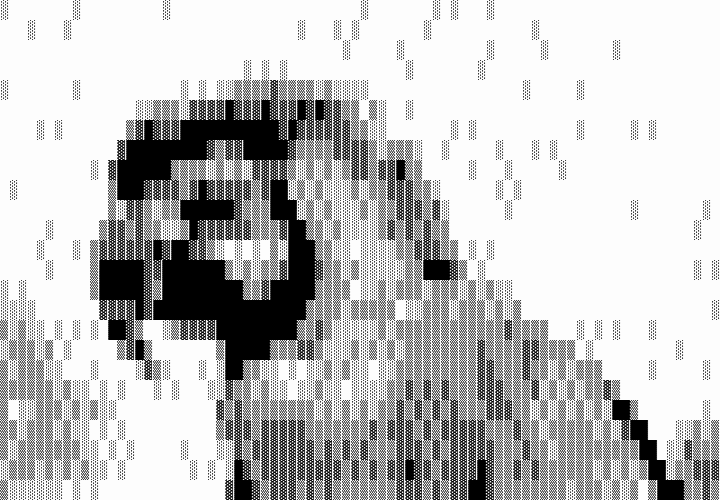
Image rendered in MDA text mode using semigraphics blocks

The MDA was based on the IBM System/23 Datamaster's display system, and was intended to support business and word processing use with its sharp, high-resolution characters. Each character is rendered in a box of 9 × 14 pixels, of which 7 × 11 depicts the character itself and the other pixels provide space between character columns and lines. Some characters, such as the lowercase m, are rendered eight pixels across.

The theoretical total screen display resolution of the MDA is 720 × 350 pixels, if the dimensions of all character cells are added up, but the MDA cannot address individual pixels to take full advantage of this resolution. Each character cell can be set to one of 256 bitmap characters stored in ROM on the card, and this character set cannot be altered from the built-in hardware code page 437. The only way to simulate graphics is through ASCII art, obtaining a low-resolution 80 × 25 screen, based on character positions.

Code page 437 has 256 characters (0-255), including the standard 95 printable ASCII characters from (32-126), and the 33 ASCII control codes (0-31 and 127) are replaced with printable graphic symbols. It also includes another 128 characters (128-255), like the aforementioned characters for drawing forms. Some of these shapes appear in Unicode as box-drawing characters.

There are several attribute values - bit flags that can be set on each character on the screen. These are invisible, underline, normal, bright (bold), reverse video, and blinking. Reverse video swaps the foreground and background colors, while blinking causes text to flash periodically. Some of these attributes can be combined, so that e.g., bright, underlined text can be rendered.

| Attribute | Display |
|---|---|
| Invisible | Invisible |
| Normal | Normal |
| Underline | Underline |
| Bright | Bright |
| Bright underline | Bright underline |
| Reverse video | Reverse video |
| Invisible reverse | Invisible reverse |

Early versions of the MDA board have hardware capable of outputting red, green and blue TTL signals on the normally unconnected DE-9 video connector pins, theoretically allowing an 8-color display with a suitable monitor. The registers also allow the monochrome mode to be set on and off. No (widely) published software exists to actually control the feature.

It is also possible to combine the values of output pins 7 (Video) and 6 (Intensity), to generate four brightness levels. Video corresponds to 2/3 luminance and Intensity to 1/3 luminance), but the actual display of these levels is monitor-dependent:

| Output pin values | | Displayed brightness |
| 7 – Video | 6 – High intensity | Displayed brightness |
|---|---|---|
| 0 | 0 | |
| 0 | 1 | |
| 1 | 0 | |
| 1 | 1 | |

== Use ==
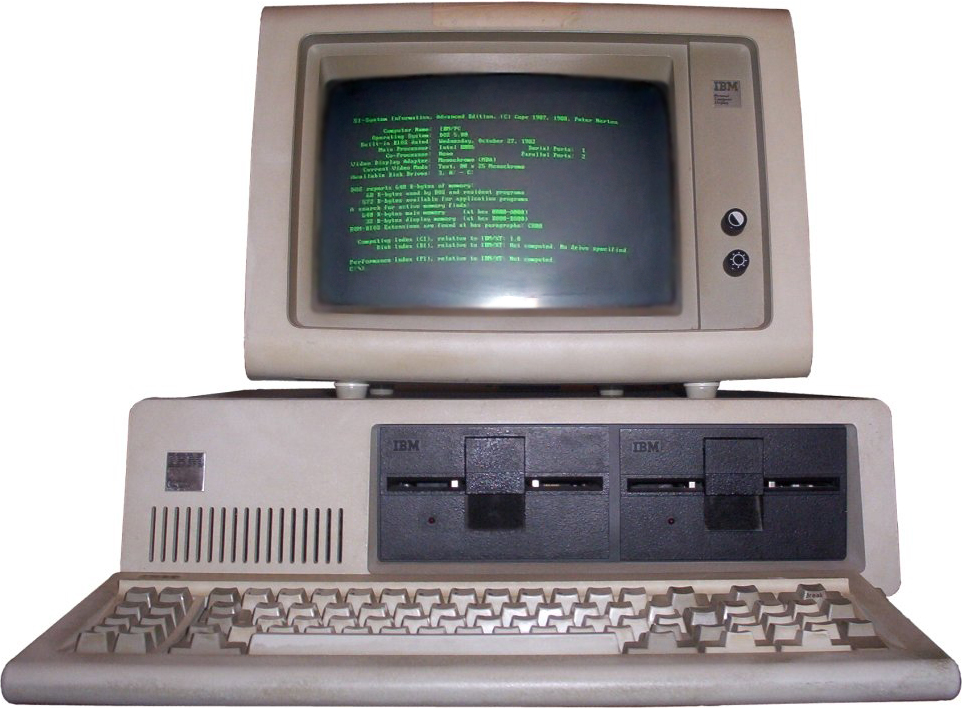
IBM 5151 monitor driven by a Monochrome Display Adapter (MDA)

The MDA was released alongside the IBM Color Graphics Adapter, and can be installed alongside the CGA in the same computer. A command included with PC DOS permits switching the primary display between the CGA and MDA cards. Some software like Lotus 1-2-3 supports using both cards at the same time.

Because of the lack of pixel-addressable graphics, MDA owners were unable to play PC games released with graphics support. However, textmode games were released for the PC (including text adventures) and at least one game, IBM's One Hundred And One Monochrome Mazes, requires MDA. Box-drawing characters made the production of rudimentary graphics practical for early PC game titles, including BBS door games or titles such as Castle Adventure.

Another use for the MDA was as a secondary display for debugging. Applications like SoftICE and the Windows debugger permitted the simultaneous use of an MDA and another graphics card, with the MDA displaying a debugger interface while the other card was showing the primary display.

=== Disadvantage ===
A typical 8-bit monochrome card can turn the 16-bit 8 MHz ISA bus into an 8-bit 4 MHz PC bus, which cuts bus bandwidth by up to 75%. If the monochrome card is added to the PC as a second card besides a normal VGA card for debugging purposes, this results in slow VGA performance. Microsoft recommended removing the monochrome card in such a setup for maximum speed of the VGA card.

== Reception ==
The author of an internal IBM publication stated in October 1981 that he had planned to purchase the CGA adapter but changed his mind after seeing its poor display quality. Describing MDA as beautiful, he observed that "you stare at text a whole lot more than you stare at color graphics". MDA was more popular than CGA for business applications. The higher resolution of MDA's text and inclusion of a printer port made it more appealing for the business applications that were the focus of the original PC. However, dissatisfaction with its limitations quickly led to third parties releasing competing hardware.

A well-known example is the Hercules Graphics Card. Introduced in 1982, it offers both an MDA-compatible high-resolution text mode and a monochrome graphics mode. The founder of Hercules Computer Technology, Van Suwannukul, created the Hercules Graphics Card so that he could work on his doctoral thesis on an IBM PC using the Thai alphabet, which is impossible at the low resolution of CGA or the fixed character set of MDA. Hercules can address individual pixels, and displays a black and white pixel-addressable graphics of 720 × 348 pixels, superior to the CGA card. Despite lacking color capability, the Hercules adapter's combination of high-resolution bitmap graphics and MDA-grade text quality made it a popular choice, and many clone cards appeared.

== Specifications ==
DE-9 connector, looking at back of PC

MDA cards used a DE-9 output port intended for a digital TTL monitor, like the IBM monochrome monitor.

MDA connector pin assignments
| Pin | Function |
|---|---|
| 1 | Ground |
| 2 | Ground |
| 3, 4, 5 | Not used |
| 6 | Intensity |
| 7 | Video |
| 8 | Horizontal sync (+) |
| 9 | Vertical sync (−) |

The signal had the following specifications:

- Type: Digital, TTL
- Resolution: 720 × 350
- Horizontal frequency: 18.432 kHz
- Vertical frequency: 50 Hz
- Colors: Monochrome, with 2 to 4 intensity levels (depending on monitor)

== Clone boards ==
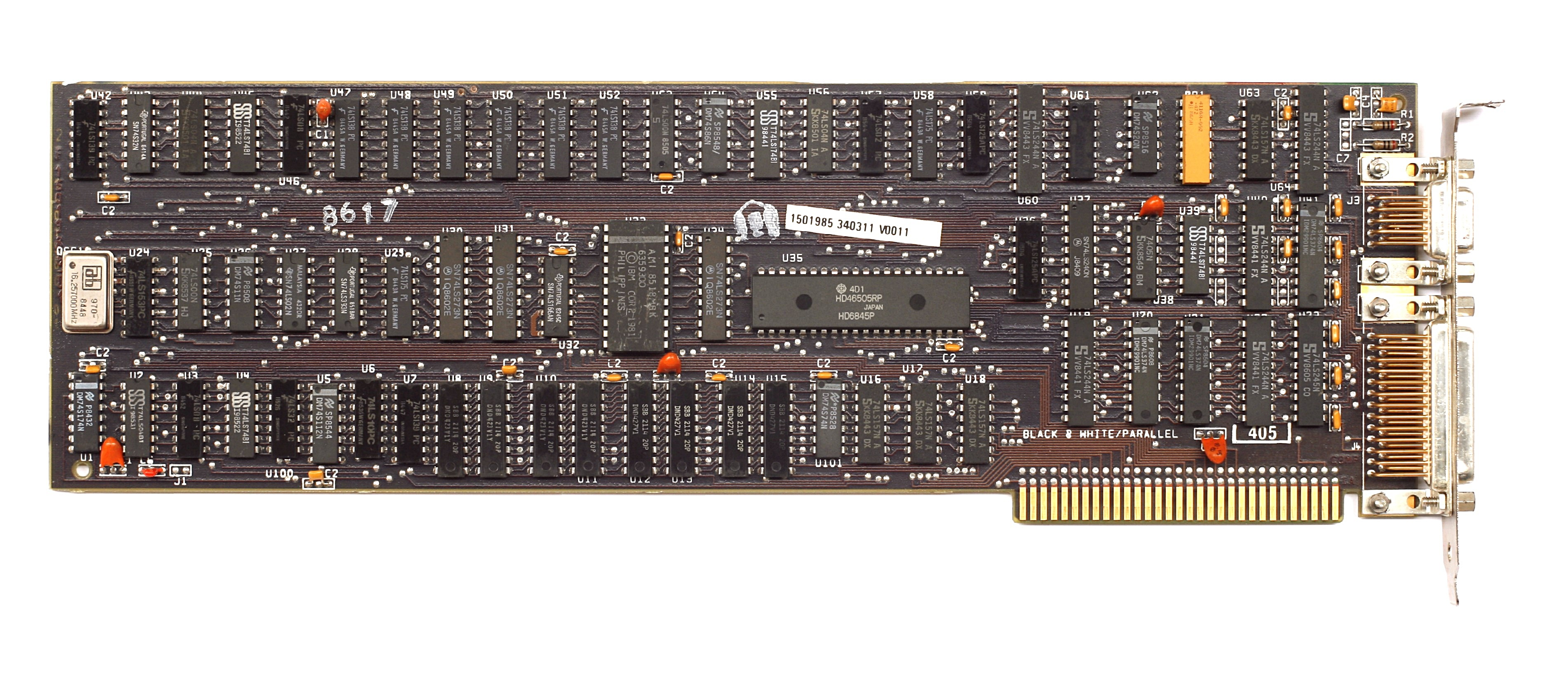
MDA Video card with Hitachi HD6845 (= Motorola MC6845)

Other boards offer MDA compatibility, although with differences on how attributes are displayed or the font used.

- 3270 PC
- Amstrad PPC / PC20
- Control Systems Artist 1
- Tamarack Microelectronics TD3088A3

== See also ==
- Hercules Graphics Card
- Color Graphics Adapter
- Orchid Graphics Adapter
- Green-screen display
- Light pen (only in very early MDA cards)
- List of video connectors
- List of defunct graphics chips and card companies
- VGA text mode
