= Monochrome monitor =

Type of CRT computer monitor

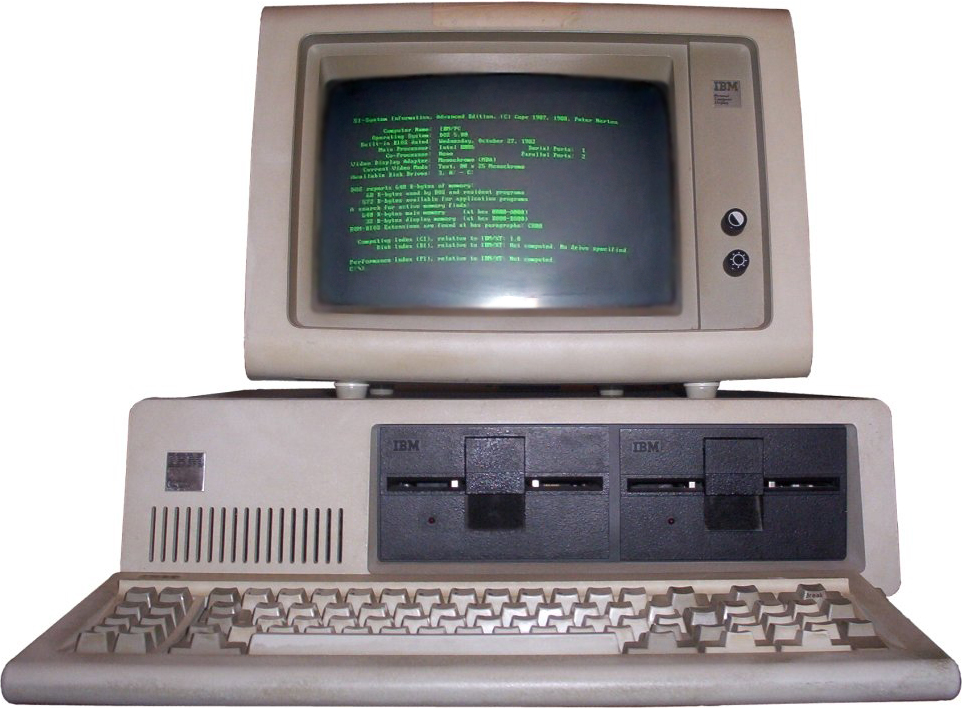
An IBM computer with a green monochrome monitor

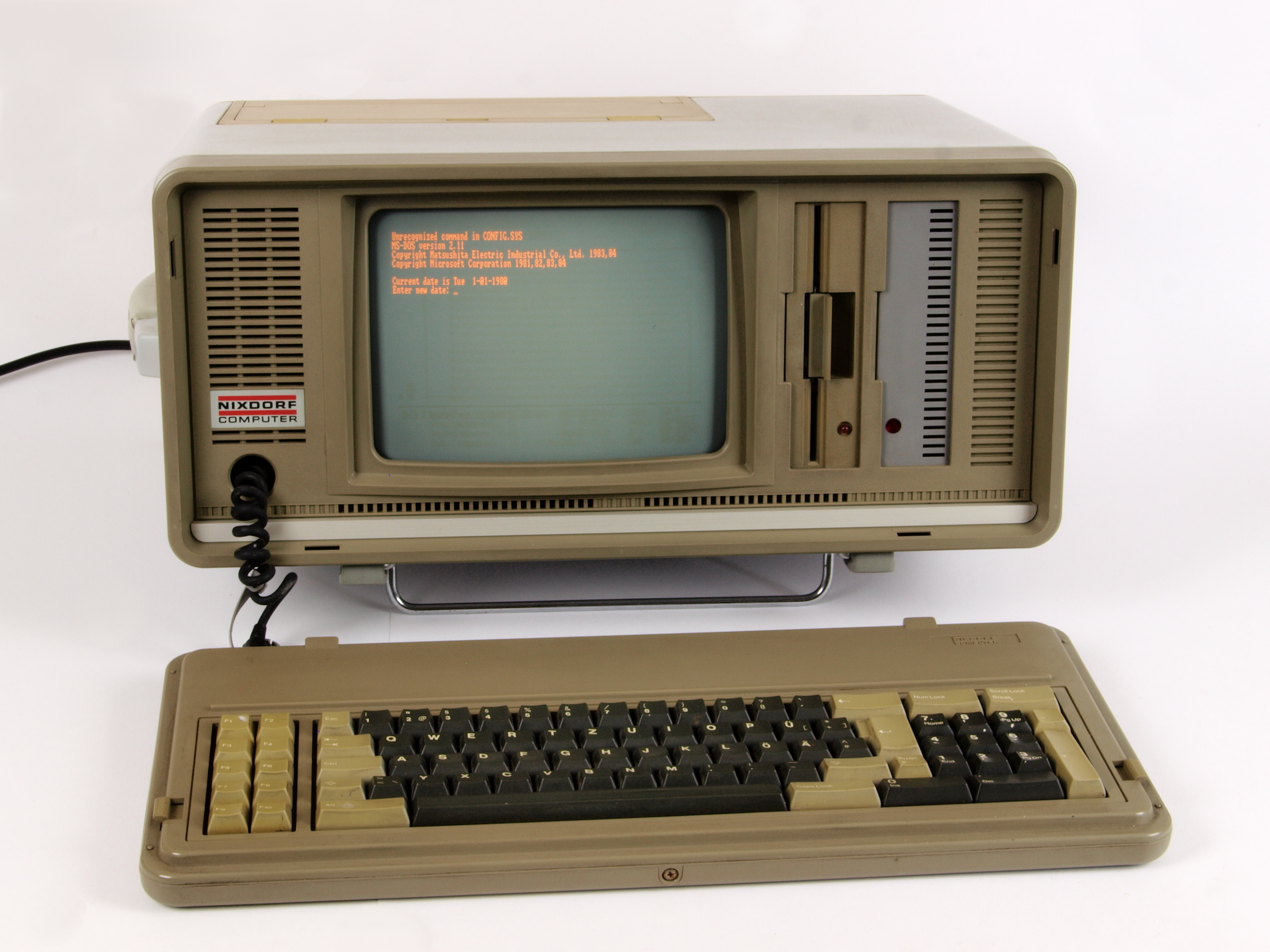
Early Nixdorf computer with an amber monitor

A monochrome monitor is a type of computer monitor in which computer text and images are displayed in varying tones of only one color, as opposed to a color monitor that can display text and images in multiple colors. They were very common in the early days of computing, from the 1960s through the 1980s, before color monitors became widely commercially available. They are still widely used in applications such as computerized cash register systems, owing to the age of many registers. Green screen was the common name for a monochrome monitor using a green "P1" phosphor screen; the term is often misused to refer to any block mode display terminal, regardless of color, e.g., IBM 3279, 3290.

Abundant in the early-to-mid-1980s, they succeeded Teletype terminals and preceded color CRTs and later LCDs as the predominant visual output device for computers.

== CRT Design ==
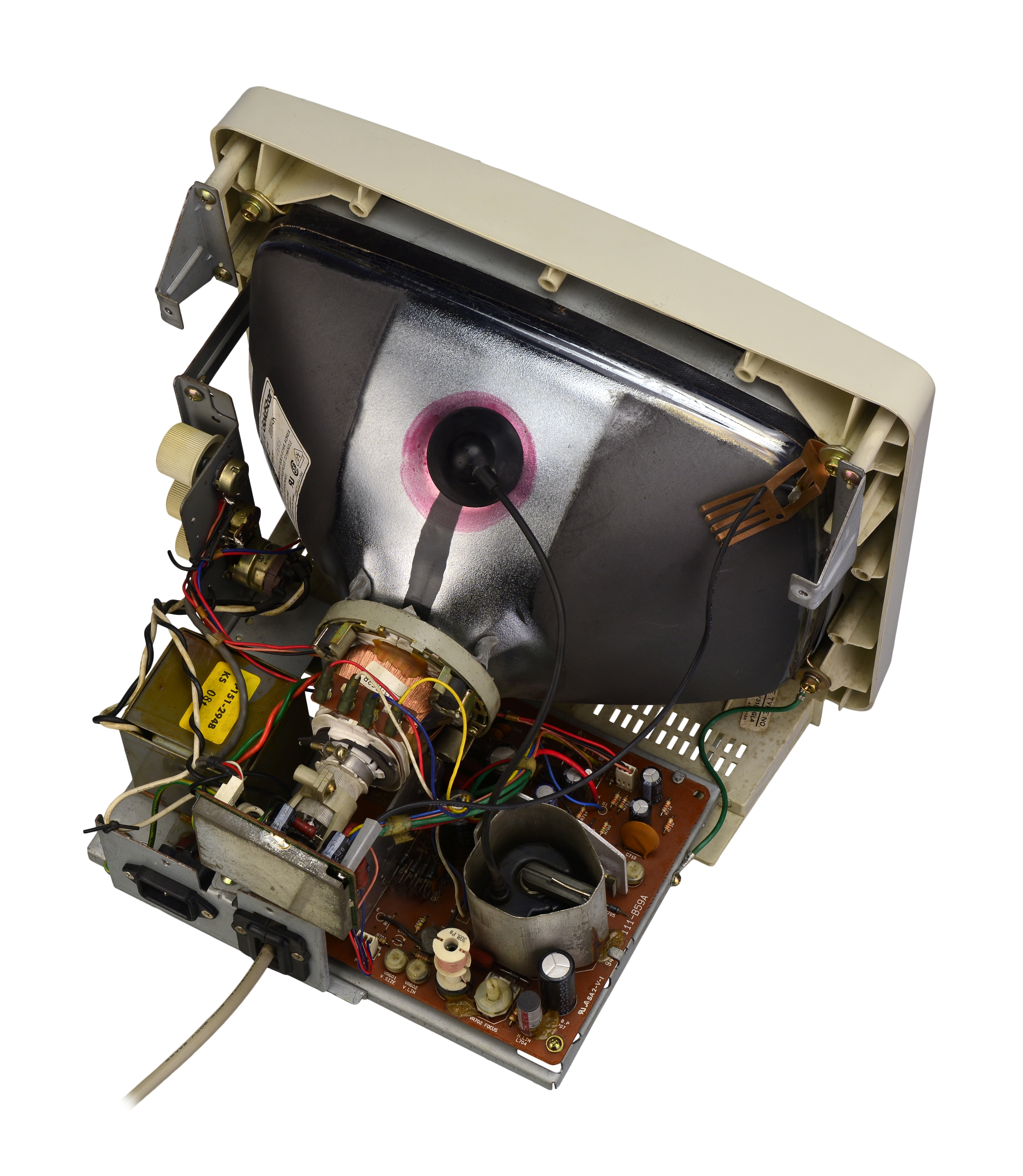
An open Schneider MM12 from 1988. It uses a GoldStar Type 310KGLA amber tube.

The most common technology for monochrome monitors was the CRT, although other technologies, e.g., plasma displays, were also used. Unlike color monitors, which display text and graphics in multiple colors through the use of alternating-intensity red, green, and blue phosphors, monochrome monitors have only one color of phosphor (mono means "one", and chrome means "color"). All text and graphics are displayed in that color. Some monitors have the ability to vary the brightness of individual pixels, thereby creating the illusion of depth and color, exactly like a black-and-white television.

Typically, only a limited set of brightness levels was provided to save display memory which was very expensive in the '70s and '80s. Either normal/bright or normal/dim (1 bit) per character as in the VT100 or black, dark gray, light gray, white (2bit) per pixel like the NeXT MegaPixel Display.

Monochrome monitors are commonly available in three colors: if the P1 phosphor is used, the screen is green monochrome. If the P3 phosphor is used, the screen is amber monochrome. If the P4 phosphor is used, the screen is white monochrome (known as "page white"); this is the same phosphor as used in early television sets. Amber screens were considered more ergonomic as they reduced eye strain, following the same principle as modern blue light filters (visual comfort filters), which limit the most energetic wavelengths (blue) that cause eye fatigue and give screens a more amber tint. Although they may improve comfort during prolonged use, there is no definitive evidence that these filters protect against long-term retinal damage.

== Usage ==
Well-known examples of early monochrome monitors are the VT100 from Digital Equipment Corporation, released in 1978, the Apple Monitor III in 1980, and the IBM 5151, which accompanied the IBM PC model 5150 upon its 1981 release.

The 5151 was designed to work with the PC's Monochrome Display Adapter (MDA) text-only graphics card, but the third-party Hercules Graphics Card became a popular companion to the 5151 screen because of the Hercules' comparatively high-resolution bitmapped 720×348 pixel monochrome graphics capability, much used for business presentation graphics generated from spreadsheets like Lotus 1-2-3. This was much higher resolution than the alternative IBM Color Graphics Adapter 320×200 pixel, or 640×200 pixel graphic standard. It could also run most programs written for the CGA card's standard graphics modes. Monochrome monitors continued to be used, even after the introduction of higher resolution color IBM Enhanced Graphics Adapter and Video Graphics Array standards in the late 1980s, for dual-monitor applications.

== Clarity ==
Pixel for pixel, monochrome CRT monitors produce sharper text and images than color CRT monitors. This is because a monochrome monitor is made up of a continuous coating of phosphor and the sharpness can be controlled by focusing the electron beam; whereas on a color monitor, screen space is divided into triads of three phosphor dots (one red, one blue, one green) separated by a mask. The effective resolution of a color monitor is limited by the density of these triads. Furthermore, pixels in the source image will not align precisely to these triads, so moire effects will occur as the image resolution approaches the limit imposed by the size of the phosphor triads. Monochrome monitors were used in almost all dumb terminals and were widely used in text-based applications such as computerized cash registers and point of sale systems because of their superior sharpness and enhanced readability.

Some green screen displays were furnished with a particularly full/intense phosphor coating, making the characters very clear and sharply defined (thus easy to read) but generating an afterglow-effect (sometimes called a "ghost image") when the text scrolled down the screen or when a screenful of information was quickly replaced with another as in word processing page up/down operations. Other green screens avoided the heavy afterglow-effects, but at the cost of much more pixelated character images. The 5151, amongst others, had brightness and contrast controls to allow the user to set their own compromise.

== Phosphor limitations ==
Monochrome monitors are particularly susceptible to screen burn (hence the advent, and name, of the screensaver), because the phosphors used are of very high intensity.

Another effect of the high-intensity phosphors is an effect known as "ghosting", wherein a dim afterglow of the screen's contents is briefly visible after the screen has been blanked.

This ghosting effect is deliberate on some monitors, known as "long persistence" monitors. These use the relatively long decay period of the phosphor glow to reduce flickering and eye strain.

== In popular culture ==
The color scheme, grid layout of characters, and ghosting effects of the now-obsolete monochrome CRT screens have become an eye-catching visual shorthand for computer-generated text, frequently in "futuristic" settings. The opening titles of the first Ghost in the Shell film and the digital rain effect of the Matrix trilogy science fiction films prominently feature computer displays with ghosting green text.

A similar grid of amber text is used in the science fiction TV show Travelers.

A free application for Linux terminal software called "Cool Retro Term" is available to accurately emulate old CRT Monochrome terminals for nostalgia or retrocomputing reasons. There is also an Xscreensaver hack called phosphor which emulates a long-persistence green screen and can be used as a terminal.

The Fallout video game series features the Pip-Boy product line, a fictional brand of portable computer that serves as the games’ inventory and status menu. Each game defaults to a green phosphor, other than Fallout: New Vegas, which defaults to amber.

== See also ==
- IBM 3270
- IBM 5250
- IBM 5151
- Apple Monitor III
