= Milos Konopasek =

American computer scientist

Milos Konopasek February 2001

Milos Konopasek (died in Boston, Massachusetts, 9 January 2002) was a Czechoslovakia-born mechanical engineer best known as the creator of TK!Solver, an iterative, constraint-based declarative environment for the numerical solution of systems of equations.

== Biography ==
Konopasek was born in Czechoslovakia and graduated from the Leningrad Textile Institute, Leningrad, USSR, and received the Ph.D. and D.Sc degrees from the University of Manchester, England. His career included management, research, and teaching positions in Czechoslovakia, United Kingdom, and the United States, including at the Georgia Institute of Technology and North Carolina State University.

At Manchester in the late 1960s and early 1970s, he developed a system called "Question Answering System on mathematical models" (QAS). He expected his system to be used by a broad range of non-computer professionals and non-mathematicians who apply math to their fields.

Konopasek recognized that the new personal computer was an ideal vehicle for bringing his concept to the masses and developed a version of his system for them in 1977. In 1982, Software Arts commercialized TK!Solver based on his work.

Konopasek was Senior Scientist at Software Arts while holding a visiting faculty position in the Department of Mechanical Engineering at M.I.T.; when TK!Solver was sold to Universal Technical Systems (Rockford, Illinois), he continued as Vice President of UTS.

Most of his research interests and contributions were in textile engineering, applied mechanics, operations research, and computer science, in areas as diverse as CAD/CAM, large deflection analysis of slender bodies, topology of line structures, and language design. Konopasek was a member of the ACM and the IEEE Computer Society.
