= Ed Esber =

American businessman (born 1952)

Edward M. Esber, Jr.
- Born: 1952 (age 73–74); Cleveland, Ohio, US

Edward M. Esber, Jr. (born 1952) is semi-retired in Park City, Utah. He supports state economic development, law enforcement initiatives, and the Silicon Slopes entrepreneurial community.

== Summary ==
As a PC industry veteran, he pioneered the marketing and distribution of personal computer productivity software. Afterwards, he did seminal work on the integration of computers and multimedia; the integration of computers, toys and learning; the integration of computers, communication and telephony; the mobilization of email and internet access and personal computer mobility. As an active board member and/or executive, he was involved in one of the first computer games company, the first hardcard, one of the first disk drive companies, the first one pound MS-DOS computer, the first Tablet PC, the first DVR and the first MP3 player.

Esber is also recognized for his role in transitioning software from a technical novelty to a commercial industry, promoting user-friendly applications that made PCs accessible to broader audiences.

== Education ==
Esber graduated with a BS computer engineering degree from Case Institute of Technology in 1974. He later earned a MS in electrical engineering from Syracuse University while working with IBM in 1976. He then went on to earn an MBA from Harvard Business School, in 1978.

== Early life and career ==
Esber was born in Cleveland, Ohio, the oldest of eight children.

At CWRU he developed a Fortran simulation called IMPS (Industrial Marketing Plan Simulation).

He worked as an engineer/programmer in IBM's System Product Division and in product marketing at Texas Instruments Personal Computer and Consumer Products Division.

At IBM, he designed a floating-point processor for the UC.5 controller. He also introduced IBM engineers to third-party microprocessors from Intel and Motorola, which led to the development and introduction of the IBM PC. While at Harvard Business School, worked on a consulting project entitled H.E.R.M.S. (Home Energy Management System) exploring residential energy management.

At Texas Instruments, Esber helped develop the TI Personal Computer and contributed to the Speak & Spell educational toy.

In 1979, Dan Flystra recruited Esber to run worldwide sales and marketing for Personal Software (later renamed VisiCorp). While there, he helped manage distribution of Visicalc. VisiCalc is commonly referred to as the killer application that drove the personal computer sales for businesses. It was credited with sparking the explosive growth of Apple Computer and the beginning of the Personal Computer Software revolution. He was also involved in the launch of VisiPak (the first PC office suite) and VisiON (the first graphical user interface for PCs).

As one of the first business leaders to focus on software as a primary driver of PC utility, Esber helped establish market structures for software licensing, packaging, and distribution.

=== Ashton-Tate ===
Esber took over Ashton-Tate in 1985. During his time as CEO, Ashton-Tate acquired several companies, including Decision Resources and MultiMate. Ashton-Tate grew from $40 million in revenue to over $300 million during his tenure.

While at Ashton-Tate, Esber had several strategic merger discussions with the likes of Lotus and Microsoft which were all rejected by the board. Ultimately, he initiated the company's sale to Borland.

In May 1990, he stepped down as Chairman over disagreements on strategy, mergers and acquisitions with the board. Industry analysts noted that Esber’s departure came amid mounting competition and internal challenges at Ashton-Tate, particularly over adapting to new Windows-based environments.

=== Creative Labs ===
In 1994, he was appointed CEO of Creative Labs.

=== Creative Insights/SoloPoint ===
Esber was a founder and CEO of a Computer Toys company called Creative Insights and the CEO of SoloPoint, a telephony products company.

=== Angel investment/venture capital ===
Esber was a founding member in 1997 of The Angels Forum, a professional, Silicon Valley–based group of angel investors. He also is a member of the management team of The Halo Funds.

=== Current endeavors ===
Esber is currently helping the State of Utah continue its growth by serving on the Utah Capital Investment Corporation, the Utah Technology Initiative Advisory Board and past member of the Utah Small Business Growth Initiative Board, Utah Capital board, Utah Technology board. He served as the past Chairman of the Utah 1033 Foundation. which provides financial support for the families of Utah law enforcement officers killed in the line of duty and the Summit County Sheriff's Citizen's Advisory Board.

== Honors and awards ==
- BusinessWeek, "25 Executives to Watch,” April 15, 1988.
- Computer Reseller News, 1985–1986, "Industry's 25 Most Influential Execs."
- Esquire Magazine, 1986 Register Honoree, Business and Industry.
- So Ca Executive, "The Southland's 100 Outstanding Leaders in 1986."
- Albert Nelson Marquis Lifetime Achievement Award from Marquis Who’s Who, recognizing sustained contributions to the software industry and executive leadership.

== Boards ==
Esber has served on over 40 public, private, and non-profit boards. He currently sits on the boards of PanTerra Networks and is co-chair of the emeriti trustee committee of Case Western Reserve University. In the past Esber has served on the boards of Activision, Ashton Tate, Quantum Corporation, SONICblue, Pansophic Systems, Integrated Circuits System Technology and many private companies.
