= IBM 5151 =

Monochrome computer monitor

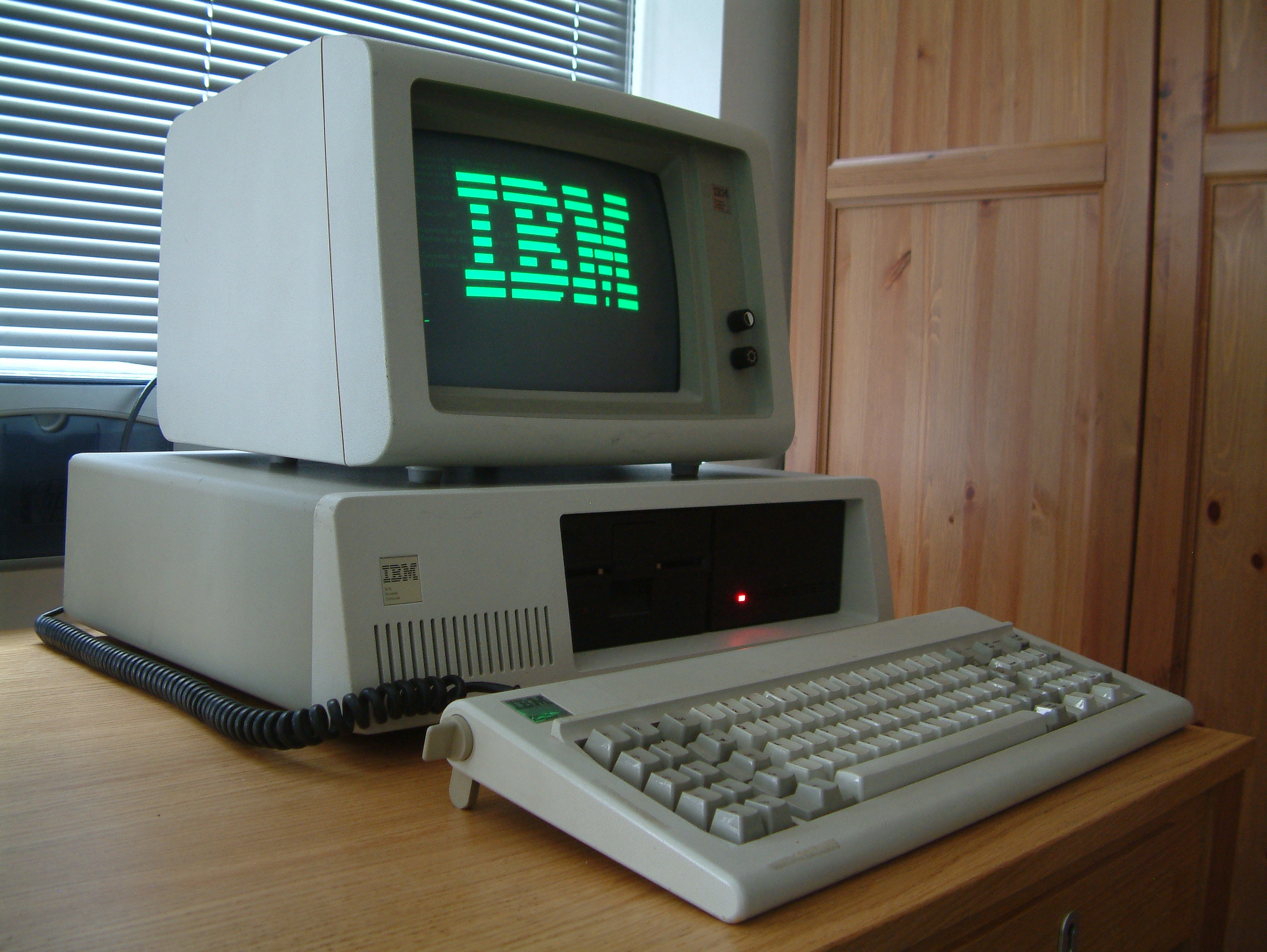
An IBM PC with a 5151 monitor

The IBM 5151 is a 12" transistor–transistor logic (TTL) monochrome monitor, shipped with the original IBM Personal Computer for use with the IBM Monochrome Display Adapter. A few other cards were designed to work with it, such as the Hercules Graphics Card.

The monitor has an 11.5-inch wide CRT (measured diagonally) with 90 degree deflection, etched to reduce glare, with a resolution of 350 horizontal lines and a 50 Hz refresh rate. It uses TTL digital inputs through a 9-pin D-shell connector, being able to display at least three brightness levels, according to the different pin 6 and 7 signals. It is also plugged into the female AC port on the IBM PC power supply, and thus does not have a power switch of its own.

The IBM 5151 uses the P39 phosphor type, producing a bright green monochrome image intended for displaying high-resolution text. This phosphor has high persistence, which decreases display flicker but causes smearing when the image changes.

== Specifications ==
Type	Digital, TTL
Resolution	720 x 350
Size	11 in × 15 in × 14 in (280 mm × 380 mm × 360 mm) (H×W×D)
Weight	12.5 lbs(5.44311 kg )
Heat output	95.2 W
H-freq	18.432 kHz
V-freq	50 Hz
