= Dan Fylstra =

American software specialist

Dan Fylstra is an American pioneer of the software products industry.

A graduate of the Massachusetts Institute of Technology, in 1975 he was a founding associate editor of Byte magazine. In 1978 he co-founded the company Personal Software, and that year reviewed the Commodore PET 2001 and TRS-80 Model I for Byte while studying for an MBA at the Harvard Business School, having ordered each almost immediately after release. Personal Software became the distributor of a new program named VisiCalc, the first-ever computer spreadsheet. As part of his marketing efforts Fylstra ran teaser advertisements in Byte that asked, considering electronic spreadsheets were an entirely new product category, "How did you ever do without it?"

VisiCalc soon became popular, and people began asking for VisiCalc and also the computer (the Apple II) they would need to run the program. VisiCalc sales exceeded 700,000 units by 1983. The VisiCalc-Apple association suggested the hypothesis of the "killer app"—or the "software tail that wags the hardware dog".

Fylstra's software products company, later named VisiCorp, was the #1 earning personal-computer software publisher in 1981 with $20 million in revenues as well as in 1982 with $35 million (exceeding Microsoft which became the largest such company in 1983).

Fylstra is the former president of the company Sierra Sciences, and is currently president of software vendor Frontline Systems. He joined the Libertarian Party in 1998.
