= IBM Personal Computer =

1981 American microcomputer model

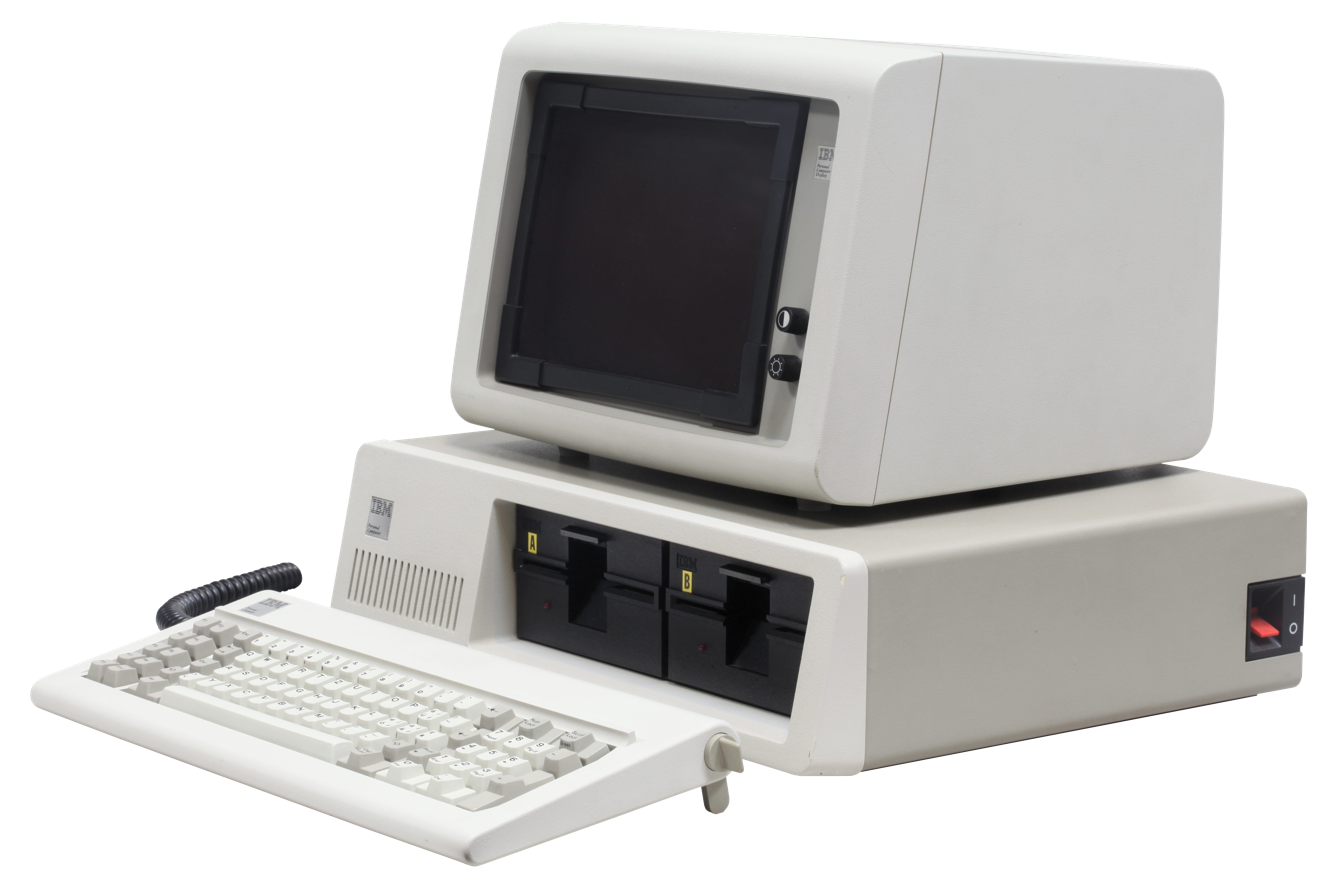
- IBM Personal Computer with keyboard and monitor
- Also known as: IBM PC
- Developer: International Business Machines (IBM)
- Manufacturer: IBM
- Product family: IBM PC
- Type: Personal computer
- Generation: First generation
- Released: August 12, 1981; 45 years ago
- Lifespan: 1981–1987
- Introductory price: US$1,565 (equivalent to $5,540 in 2025)
- Discontinued: April 2, 1987; 39 years ago
- Operating system: IBM BASIC / PC DOS 1.0; CP/M-86; UCSD p-System
- CPU: Intel 8088 @ 4.77 MHz
- Memory: 16 KB – 256 KB (motherboard) (DRAM)
- Removable storage: 5.25" Floppy drives (160 KB or 320 KB), Cassette
- Display: IBM 5151 Monochrome Display, IBM 5153 Color Display
- Graphics: MDA, CGA
- Sound: PC speaker 1-channel square-wave/1-bit digital (PWM-capable)
- Input: XT-Keyboard
- Connectivity: Serial port, parallel port
- Power: 120/240 V AC ～
- Dimensions: Approximately 20.25 in × 16.5 in × 5.5 in (51.4 cm × 41.9 cm × 14.0 cm) (width × depth × height)
- Weight: 24–30 lb (11–14 kg)
- Model Number: IBM 5150
- Predecessor: IBM System/23 Datamaster
- Successor: IBM Personal Computer XT (next model); IBM PS/2 (next generation)
- Related: List of IBM Personal Computer models
- Made in: USA

The IBM Personal Computer (model 5150), often referred to as the IBM PC, is the first microcomputer released in the IBM PC model line and the basis for the IBM PC compatible de facto standard. Released on August 12, 1981, it was created by a team of engineers and designers at International Business Machines (IBM), directed by William C. Lowe and Philip Don Estridge in Boca Raton, Florida.

Powered by an x86-architecture Intel 8088 processor, the machine was based on open architecture and third-party peripherals. Over time, expansion cards and software technology increased to support it. The PC had a substantial influence on the personal computer market; the specifications of the IBM PC became one of the most popular computer design standards in the world. The only significant competition it faced from a non-compatible platform throughout the 1980s was from Apple's Macintosh product line, as well as consumer-grade platforms created by companies like Commodore and Atari. Most present-day personal computers, including the Intel-based Mac computers manufactured from 2006 to 2022, share architectural features in common with the original IBM PC.

== History ==
Prior to the 1980s, IBM had largely been known as a provider of business computer systems. As the 1980s began, their market share in the growing minicomputer market failed to keep up with competitors, while other manufacturers were beginning to see impressive profits. The market for personal computers was dominated at the time by Tandy, Commodore, and Apple, whose machines sold for several hundred dollars each and had become very popular. The microcomputer market was large enough for IBM's attention, with $15 billion in sales by 1979 and projected annual growth of more than 40% during the early 1980s. Other large technology companies had entered this market, such as Hewlett-Packard, Texas Instruments, and Data General, and some large IBM customers were buying Apple’s products.

As early as 1980 there were rumors of IBM developing a personal computer, possibly a miniaturized version of the IBM System/370, and Matsushita acknowledged publicly that it had discussed with IBM the possibility of manufacturing a personal computer in partnership, although this project was abandoned. The public responded to these rumors with skepticism, owing to IBM's tendency towards slow-moving, bureaucratic business practices tailored towards the production of large, sophisticated and expensive business systems. As with other large computer companies, its new products typically required about four to five years for development. A well publicized quote from an industry analyst stated, "IBM bringing out a personal computer would be like teaching an elephant to tap dance."

IBM had previously produced microcomputers, such as 1975's IBM 5100, but targeted them towards businesses; the 5100 had a price tag as high as $20,000. Their entry into the home computer market needed to be competitively priced.

In the summer of 1979, Ron Mion, IBM’s Senior Business Trends Advisor for entry-level systems, proposed a plan for IBM to enter the emerging microcomputer market. At that time, the likes of Apple and Tandy were starting to encroach on the small-business marketplace that IBM intended to dominate. Mion believed that that market would grow significantly and that IBM should aggressively pursue it. However, he felt that they wouldn’t be successful unless IBM departed from its long-standing business model.

Mion’s plan called for three major departures from how IBM traditionally did business. Firstly, he recommended that IBM should greatly reduce manufacturing costs by using standard, off-the-shelf components in order to produce a competitively priced microcomputer. Secondly, that using a low-cost, third-party operating system was necessary to foster a cottage industry that could develop a broad array of applications that would help small businesses justify the purchase of a computer. Mion recommended Digital Research’s CP/M and Microsoft’s MS-DOS. His third recommendation was that IBM’s microcomputers be sold and serviced by a distribution channel consisting of independent resellers.

This plan was ultimately rejected in the fall. IBM executives reaffirmed that all “IBM” computers, and their major components, must be developed, manufactured, sold, and serviced by IBM.

In January 1980, Tandy released their Annual Report and, as was predicted in Mion's plan, it confirmed that their 1979 shipments had exceeded 100,000 TRS-80s (about $50 million worth). This led to a reappraisal of Mion’s plan.

In 1980, IBM president John Opel, recognizing the value of entering this growing market, assigned William C. Lowe and Philip Don Estridge as heads of the new Entry Level Systems unit in Boca Raton, Florida. Market research found that computer dealers were very interested in selling an IBM product, but they insisted the company use a design based on standard parts, not IBM-designed ones so that stores could perform their own repairs rather than requiring customers to send machines back to IBM for service. Another source cites time pressure as the reason for the decision to use third-party components.

Atari proposed to IBM in 1980 that it act as original equipment manufacturer for an IBM microcomputer, a potential solution to IBM's known inability to move quickly to meet a rapidly changing market. The idea of acquiring Atari was considered but rejected in favor of a proposal by Lowe that by forming an independent internal working group and abandoning all traditional IBM methods, a design could be delivered within a year and a prototype within 30 days. The prototype worked poorly but was presented with a detailed business plan which proposed that the new computer have an open architecture, use non-proprietary components and software, and be sold through retail stores, contrary to existing IBM practices. It also estimated sales of 220,000 computers over three years, more than IBM's entire installed base.

This swayed the Corporate Management Committee, which converted the group into a business unit named "Project Chess", and provided the necessary funding and authority to do whatever was needed to develop the computer in the given timeframe. The team received permission to expand to 150 people by the end of 1980, and in one day more than 500 IBM employees called in asking to join.

=== Design process ===
The design process was kept under a policy of strict secrecy, even from other IBM divisions.

Several CPUs were considered, including the Texas Instruments TMS9900, Motorola 68000 and Intel 8088. The 68000 had 32 bit registers with a flat 24 bit address space for up to 16MB of memory and was considered the best choice, but was not production-ready like the others. The IBM 801 RISC processor was also considered, since it was considerably more powerful than the other options, but rejected due to the design constraint to use off-the-shelf parts. The TMS9900 had only 16 bits of address space which was the same as other 8 bit chips and was rejected as it was inferior to the Intel 8088 which had 20 bits of address space which could use one megabyte of memory.

The Intel 8086 architecture had 16 bit registers and used a segment scheme to increase the address space to 20 bits or 1MB of memory which complicated programming but was a big step up from 64K limit of most 8 bit chips. The 8086 was designed as a source code compatible, though not binary compatible, extension of the older 8080 which made it easier to port existing software like BASIC. IBM chose the 8088 variant of the 16 bit 8086 because Intel offered a better price for the former and could provide more units, and the 8088's 8-bit bus reduced the cost of the rest of the computer. The 8088 had the advantage that IBM already had familiarity with the 8085 from designing the IBM System/23 Datamaster. The 62-pin expansion bus slots were also designed to be similar to the Datamaster slots, and its keyboard design and layout became the Model F keyboard shipped with the PC, but otherwise the PC design differed in many ways.

The 8088 motherboard was designed in 40 days, with a working prototype created in four months, demonstrated in January 1981. The design was essentially complete by April 1981, when it was handed off to the manufacturing team. PCs were assembled in an IBM plant in Boca Raton, with components made at various IBM and third party factories. The monitor was an existing design from IBM Japan; the printer was manufactured by Epson. Because none of the functional components were designed by IBM, they obtained only a handful of patents on the PC, covering such features as the bytecoding for color monitors, DMA access operation, and the keyboard interface. They were never enforced.

Many of the designers were computer hobbyists who owned their own computers, including many Apple II owners, which influenced the decisions to design the computer with an open architecture and publish technical information so others could create compatible software and expansion slot peripherals.

During the design process IBM avoided vertical integration as much as possible, for example choosing to license Microsoft BASIC rather than utilizing the in-house version of BASIC used for mainframes due to the better existing public familiarity with the Microsoft version.

=== Debut ===
The IBM PC debuted on August 12, 1981, after development for one year. Pricing started at $1,565 for a configuration with 16 KB RAM, Color Graphics Adapter, keyboard, and no disk drives. The price was designed to compete with comparable machines in the market. For comparison, the Datamaster, announced two weeks earlier as IBM's least expensive computer, cost $10,000.

IBM's marketing campaign licensed the likeness of Charlie Chaplin's character "The Little Tramp" for a series of advertisements based on Chaplin's movies, played by Billy Scudder.

The PC was IBM's first attempt to sell a computer through retail channels rather than directly to customers. Because it did not have retail experience other than the IBM Product Centers it began opening in 1980, the company ensured that software like VisiCalc and EasyWriter was quickly available. It partnered with the retail chains ComputerLand and Sears, which provided important knowledge of the marketplace and competed with IBM's own direct sales force. More than 190 ComputerLand stores already existed, while Sears was in the process of creating a handful of in-store computer centers for sale of the new product.

Reception was overwhelmingly positive, with analysts estimating sales volume in the billions of dollars in the first few years after release. After release, IBM's PC immediately became the talk of the entire computing industry. Dealers were overwhelmed with orders, including customers offering pre-payment for machines with no guaranteed delivery date. By the time the machine began shipping, the term "PC" was becoming a household name.

=== Success ===
Sales exceeded IBM's expectations by as much as 800%, with the company at one point shipping as many as 40,000 PCs per month. IBM estimated that home users made up 50 to 70% of purchases from retail stores. In 1983, IBM sold more than 750,000 machines; the company understood how the retail market differed from corporate customers better than traditional rivals. Hewlett-Packard, Xerox, and Digital Equipment Corporation (DEC)'s personal computers were unsuccessful; DEC, one of the companies whose success in competing against IBM had caused the latter to enter the PC market, sold only 69,000.

Software support from the industry grew rapidly, with the IBM nearly instantly becoming the primary target for most microcomputer software development. InfoWorld counted 753 software packages available a year after the PC's release, four times as many as were available for Apple's Macintosh 128k a year after its launch. Hardware support also grew rapidly, with 30–40 companies competing to sell memory expansion cards within a year.

By 1984, IBM's revenue from the PC market was $4 billion, more than twice that of Apple. A 1983 study of corporate customers found that two thirds of large customers standardizing on one computer chose the PC, while only 9% chose Apple. A 1985 Fortune survey found that 56% of American companies with personal computers used PCs while 16% used Apple.

Almost as soon as the PC reached the market, rumors of hardware and software compatible clones began, and the first legal PC-compatible clone—the MPC 1600 by Columbia Data Products—was released in June 1982, less than a year after the PC's debut.

Eventually, IBM sold its PC business to Lenovo in 2004.

== Hardware ==
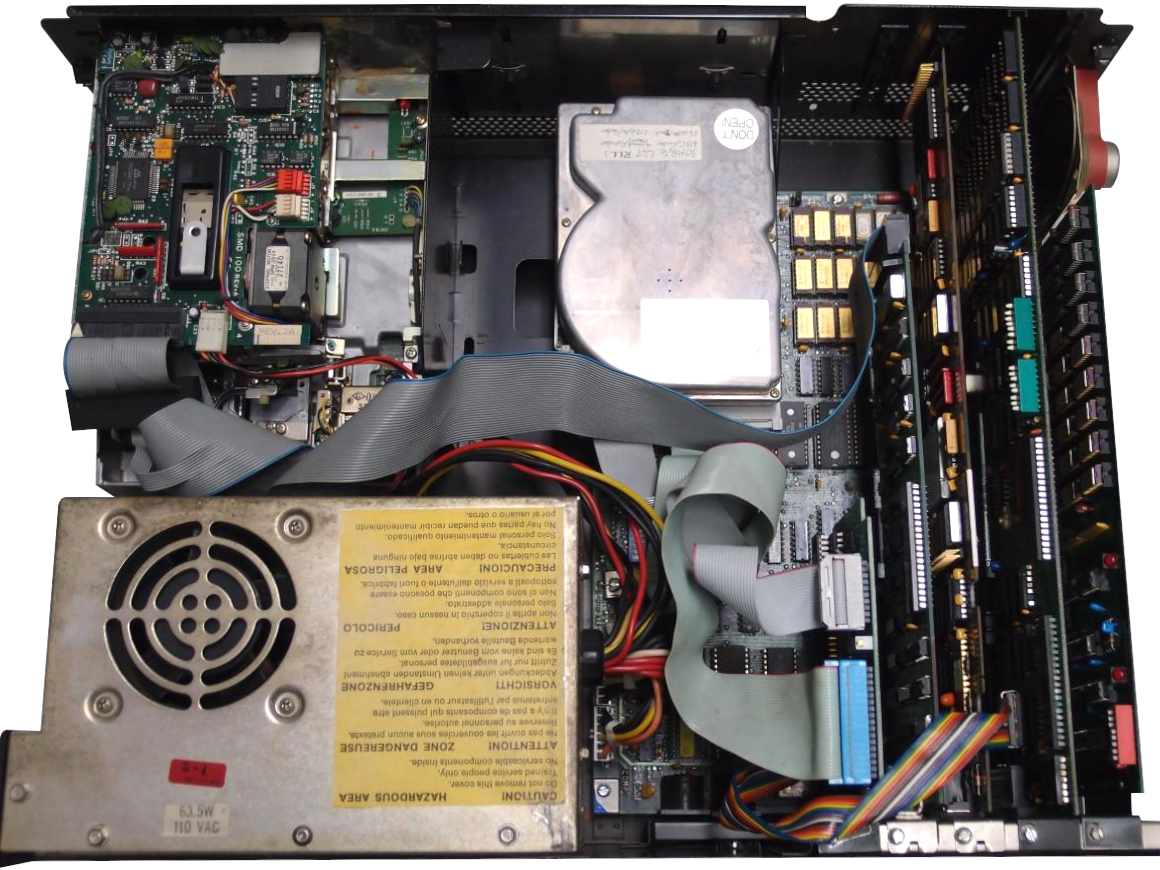
Internal view of the IBM PC (from the back), showing components and layout. This PC has been outfitted with aftermarket floppy and hard disk drives, but the motherboard and most of the expansion cards are stock.

For low cost and a quick design turnaround time, the hardware design of the IBM PC used entirely "off-the-shelf" parts from third party manufacturers, rather than unique hardware designed by IBM.

The PC is housed in a wide, short steel chassis intended to support the weight of a CRT monitor. The front panel is made of plastic, with an opening where one or two disk drives can be installed. The back panel houses a power inlet and switch, a keyboard connector, a cassette connector and a series of tall vertical slots with blank metal panels which can be removed in order to install expansion cards.

Internally, the chassis is dominated by a motherboard which houses the CPU, built-in RAM, expansion RAM sockets, and slots for expansion cards.

The IBM PC was highly expandable and upgradeable, but the base factory configuration included:

CPU	Intel 8088 @ 4.77 MHz
RAM	16 KB or 64 KB minimum (expandable to 640 KB)
Video	IBM Monochrome Display Adapter or IBM Color Graphics Adapter
Display	IBM 5151 monochrome display IBM 5153 color display Composite-input television
Input	IBM Model F 83-key keyboard with five-pin connector
Sound	Single programmable-frequency square wave with built-in speaker
Storage	Up to two internal 5.25-inch single- or double-sided full-height floppy disk drives Port for attaching to cassette tape recorder Initially no hard drive option, but see text
Expansion	Five 62-pin expansion slots attached to 8-bit CPU I/O bus IBM 5161 Expansion Chassis with eight (seven usable) extra I/O slots
Communication	Optional serial and parallel ports

=== Motherboard ===
Labelled diagram of a reproduction IBM 5150 motherboard

The PC is built around a single large circuit board called a motherboard which carries the processor, built-in RAM, expansion slots, keyboard and cassette ports, and the various peripheral integrated circuits that connected and controlled the components of the machine.

The peripheral chips included an Intel 8259 PIC, an Intel 8237 DMA controller, and an Intel 8253 PIT. The PIT provides 18.2 Hz clock "ticks" and dynamic memory refresh timing.

=== CPU and RAM ===
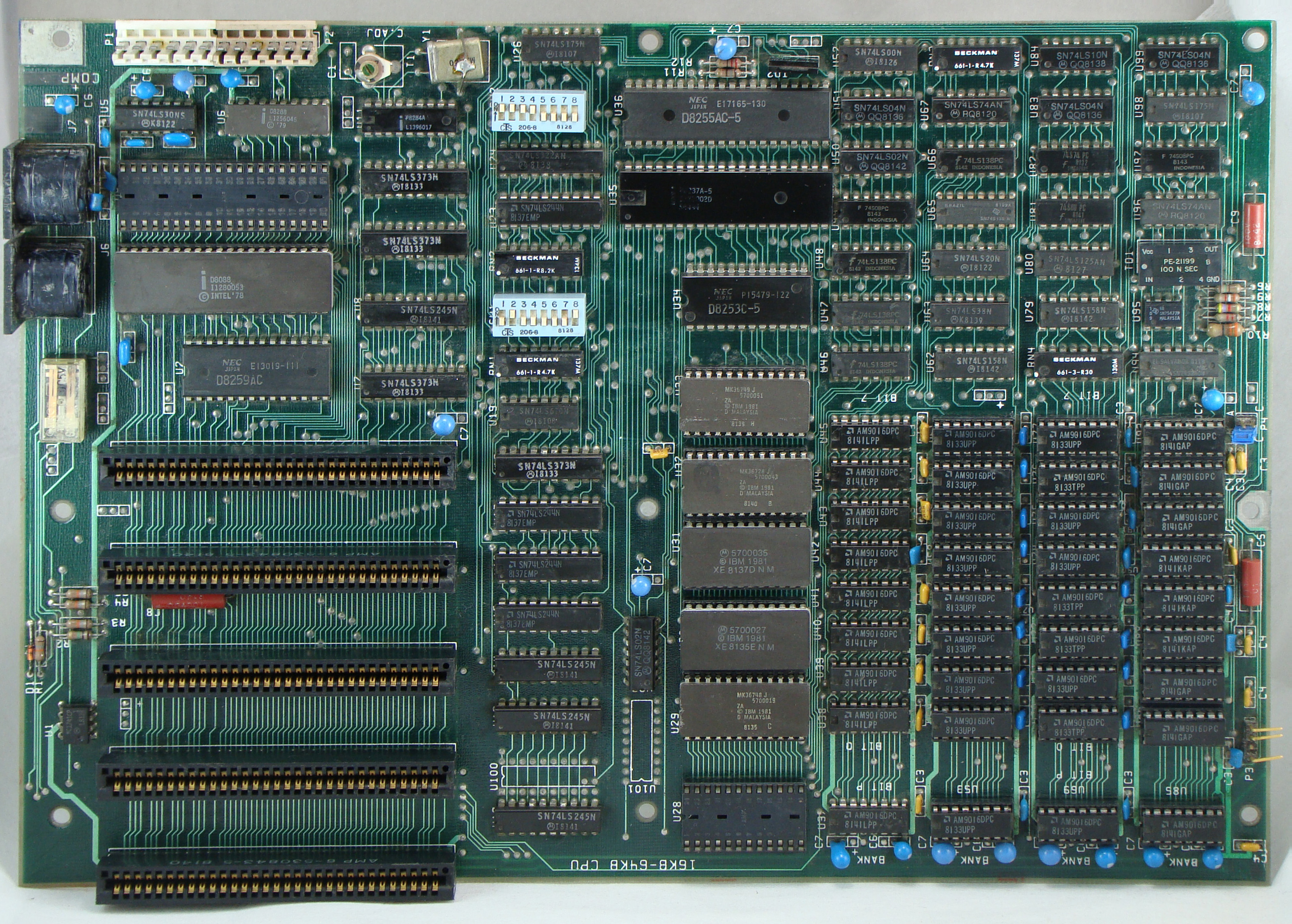
Original IBM PC motherboard with 16 KB RAM soldered and 48 KB socketed, for a total of 64 KB onboard

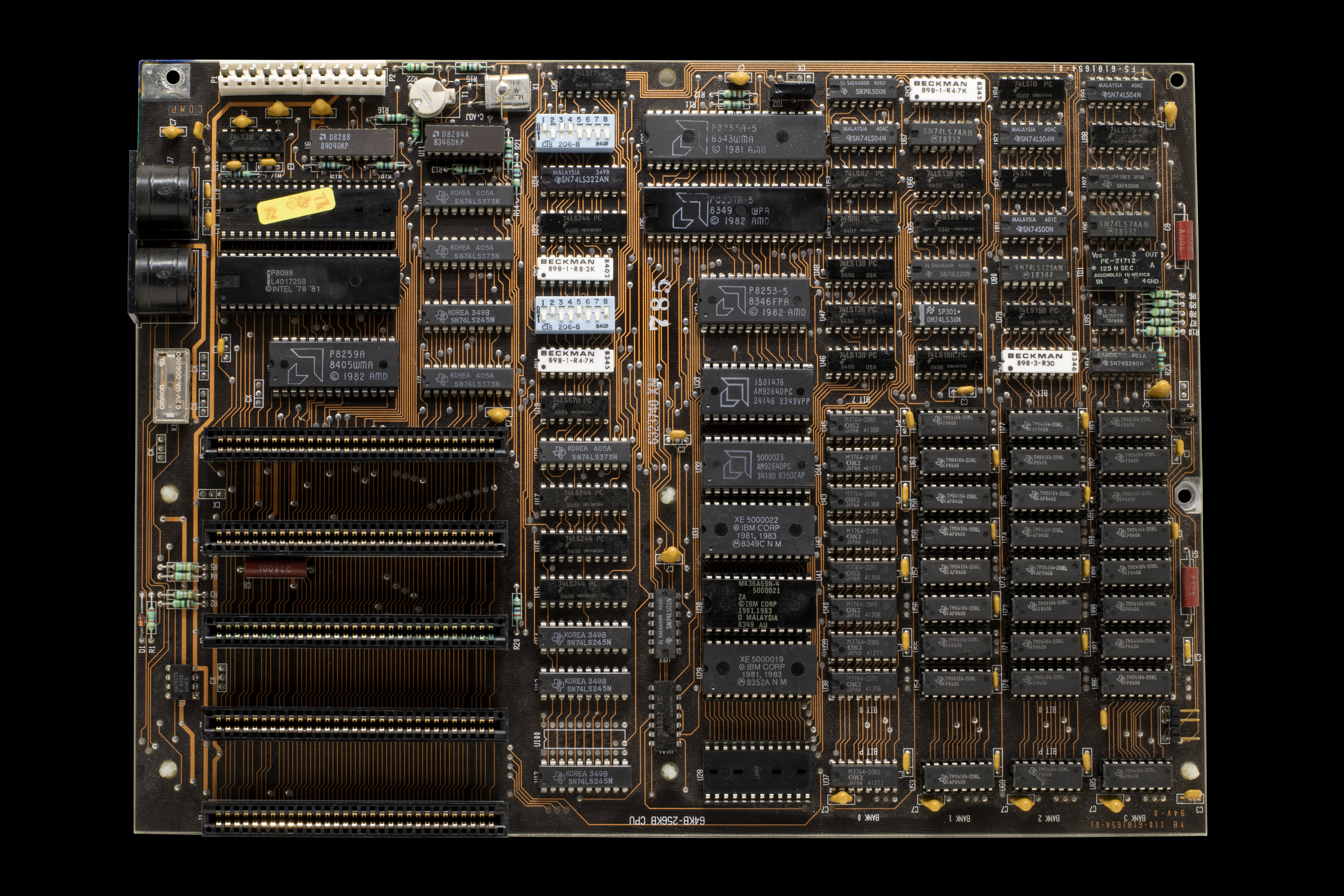
Later IBM PC motherboard with 64 KB RAM soldered and 192 KB socketed, for a total of 256 KB onboard

The CPU is an Intel 8088, a cost-reduced form of the Intel 8086 which largely retains the 8086's internal 16-bit logic, but exposes only an 8-bit bus. The CPU is clocked at 4.77 MHz; clones and later PC models have higher CPU speeds that break compatibility with software developed for the original PC. The single base clock frequency for the system is 14.31818 MHz, which when divided by 3, yielded the 4.77 MHz for the CPU (which was considered close enough to the then 5 MHz limit of the 8088), and when divided by 4, yields the required 3.579545 MHz for the NTSC color carrier frequency.

The PC motherboard includes a second, empty socket, described by IBM simply as an "auxiliary processor socket", although the most obvious use was the addition of an Intel 8087 math coprocessor, which improves floating-point math performance.

PC mainboards were manufactured with the first memory bank of initially Mostek 4116-compatible, or later 4164-compatible DIP DRAMs soldered to the board, for a minimum configuration of first just 16 KB, or later 64 KB of RAM. Memory upgrades from IBM and third parties provide socketed installation in three further onboard banks, and as ISA expansion cards.

The first 400,000 16 KB mainboards ("16KB-64KB" ID) sold until March 1983 can be upgraded to a maximum of 64 KB onboard without using slots, and the later 64 KB revision ("64KB-256KB" ID) to a maximum of 256 KB on the motherboard. RAM cards can upgrade either variant further, for a total of 640 KB conventional memory, and possibly several megabytes of expanded memory beyond that, though on PC/XT-class machines, the latter was a very expensive third-party hardware option only available later in the IBM 5150's lifecycle and only usable with dedicated software support (i.e. only accessible via a RAM window in the Upper Memory Area); this was relatively rarely equipped and utilized on the original IBM PC, much less fully so, thus the machine's maximum RAM configuration as commonly understood is 640 KB.

=== ROM BIOS ===
The BIOS is the firmware of the IBM PC, occupying one 8 KB chip on the motherboard. It provides bootstrap code and a library of common functions that all software can use for many purposes, such as video output, keyboard input, disk access, interrupt handling, testing memory, and other functions.

IBM shipped three versions of the BIOS throughout the PC's lifespan, with the dates 04/24/81, 10/19/81, and 10/27/82 (the first to boot from hard disk). The company offered an upgrade kit.

=== Display ===
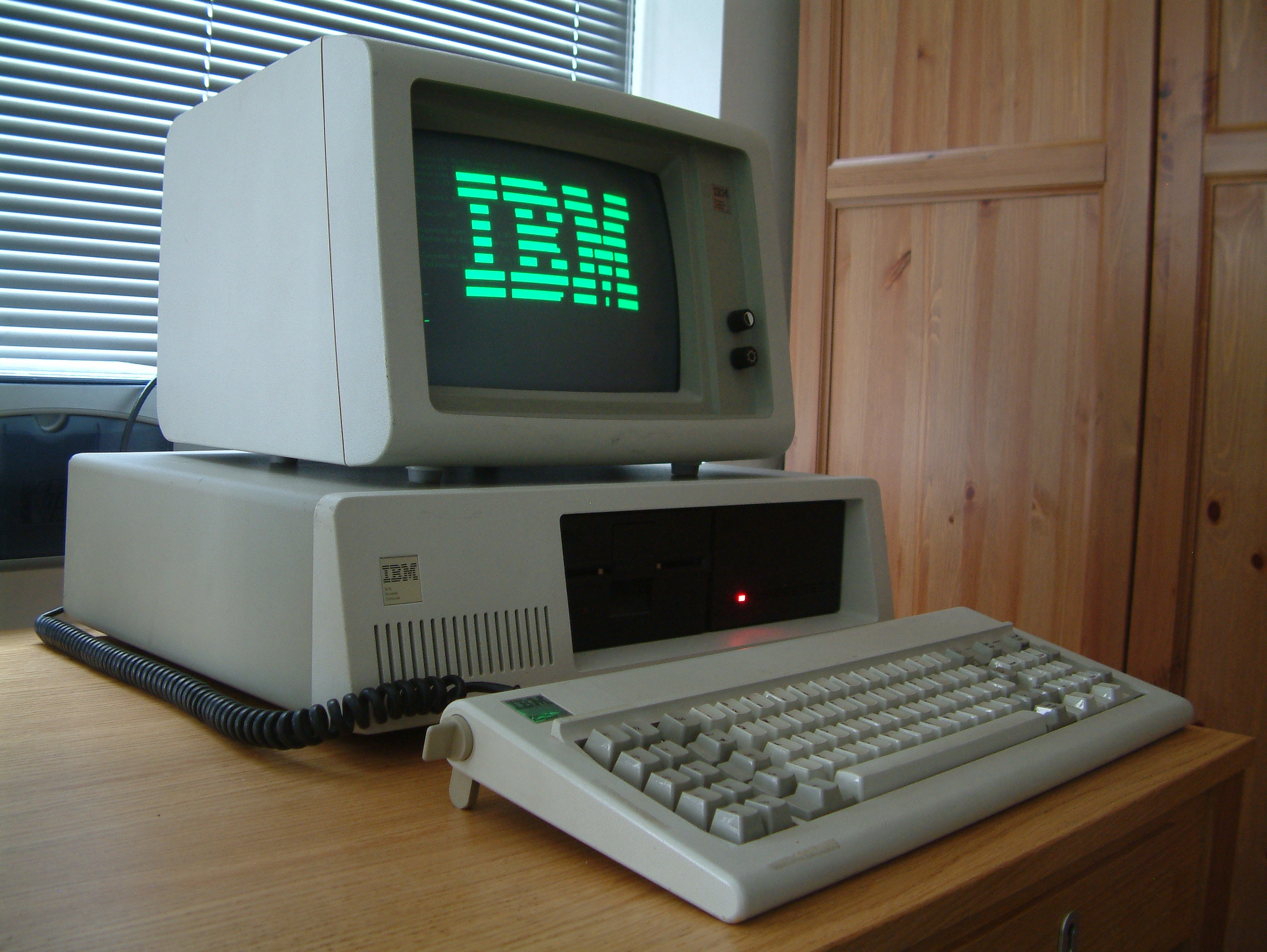
IBM PC with MDA monitor

While most home computers had built-in video output hardware, IBM took the unusual approach of offering two different graphics options, the MDA and CGA cards. The former provided high-resolution monochrome text, but could not display anything except text, while the latter provided medium- and low-resolution color graphics and text.

CGA used the same scan rate as NTSC television, allowing it to provide a composite video output which could be used with any compatible television or composite monitor, as well as a direct-drive TTL output suitable for use with any RGBI monitor using an NTSC scan rate. IBM also sold the 5153 color monitor for this purpose, but it was not available at release and was not released until March 1983.

MDA scanned at a higher line rate and required a proprietary monitor, the IBM 5151. The card also included a built-in printer port.

Both cards could also be installed simultaneously for mixed graphics and text applications. For instance, AutoCAD, Lotus 1-2-3 and other software allowed use of a CGA Monitor for graphics and a separate monochrome monitor for text menus. Third parties went on to provide an enormous variety of aftermarket graphics adapters, such as the Hercules Graphics Card.

The software and hardware of the PC, at release, was designed around a single 8-bit adaptation of the ASCII character set, now known as code page 437.

=== Storage ===
The two bays in the front of the machine could be populated with one or two 5.25″ floppy disk drives, storing 160 KB per disk side for a total of 320 KB of storage on one disk. The floppy drives require a controller card inserted in an expansion slot, and connect with a single ribbon cable with two edge connectors. The IBM floppy controller card provides an external 37-pin D-sub connector for attachment of an external disk drive, although IBM did not offer one for purchase until 1986.

As was common for home computers of the era, the IBM PC offered a port for connecting a cassette data recorder. Unlike the typical home computer however, this was never a major avenue for software distribution, probably because very few PCs were sold without floppy drives. The port was removed on the very next PC model, the XT.

At release, IBM did not offer any hard disk drive option and adding one was difficult - the PC's stock power supply had inadequate power to run a hard drive, the motherboard did not support BIOS expansion ROMs which was needed to support a hard drive controller, and both PC DOS and the BIOS had no support for hard disks. After the XT was released, IBM altered the design of the 5150 to add most of these capabilities, except for the upgraded power supply. At this point adding a hard drive was possible, but required the purchase of the IBM 5161 Expansion Unit, which contained a dedicated power supply and included a hard drive.

Although official hard drive support did not exist, the third party market did provide early hard drives that connected to the floppy disk controller, but required a patched version of PC DOS to support the larger disk sizes.

=== Human interface ===
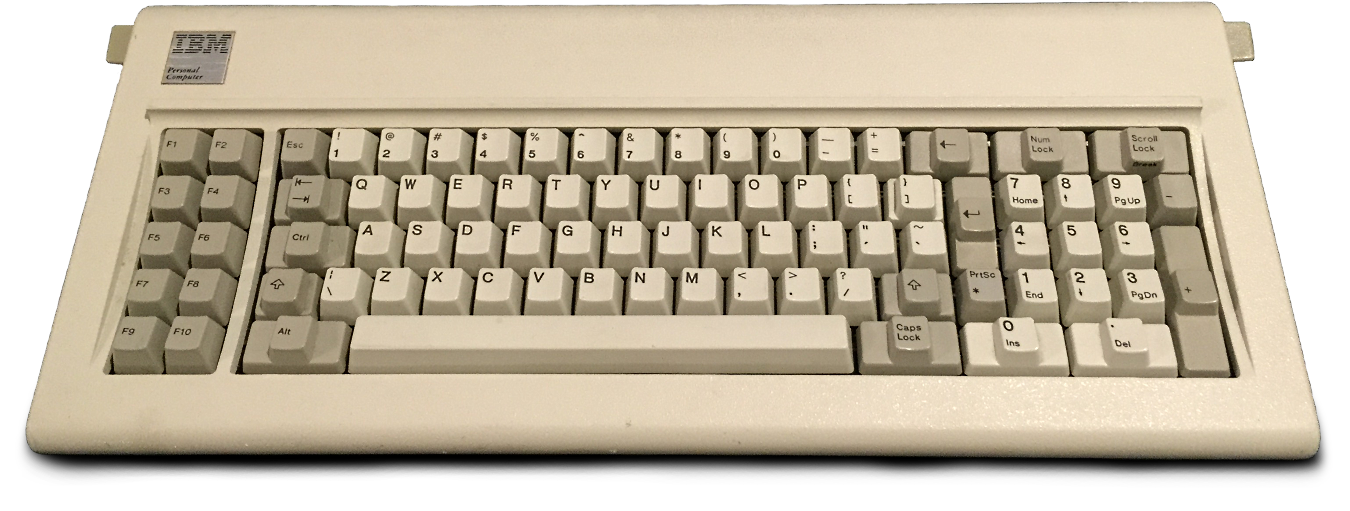
Model F keyboard

The only option for human interface provided in the base PC was the built-in keyboard port, meant to connect to the included Model F keyboard. The Model F was initially developed for the IBM Datamaster, and was substantially better than the keyboards provided with virtually all home computers on the market at that time in many regards - number of keys, reliability and ergonomics. While some home computers of the time utilized chiclet keyboards or inexpensive mechanical designs, the IBM keyboard provided good ergonomics, reliable and positive tactile key mechanisms and flip-up feet to adjust its angle. Public reception of the keyboard was extremely positive, with some sources describing it as a major selling point of the PC and even as "the best keyboard available on any microcomputer."

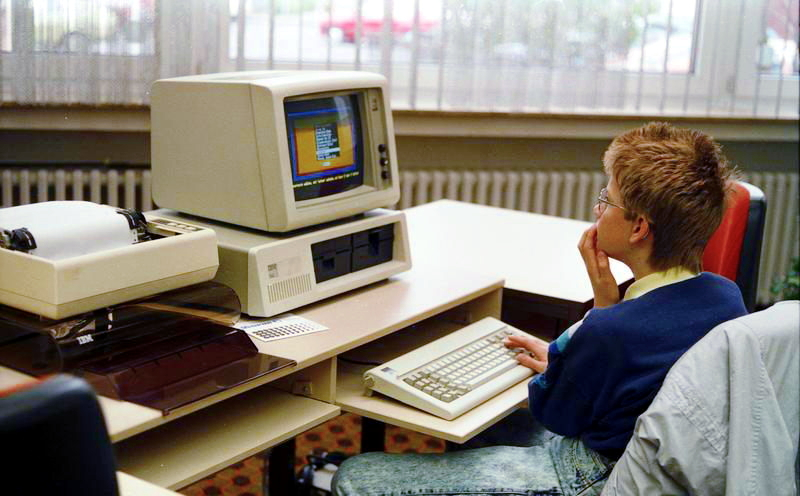
IBM PC with CGA monitor (model 5153), original keyboard, 5152 printer and paper stand (1988)

At release, IBM provided a Game Control Adapter which offered a 15-pin port intended for the connection of up to two joysticks, each having two analog axes and two buttons. (The early PCs did not have support for a mouse.)

=== Communications ===
Connectivity to other computers and peripherals was initially provided through serial and parallel ports.

IBM provided a serial card based on an 8250 UART. The BIOS supports up to two serial ports.

IBM provided two different options for connecting Centronics-compatible parallel printers. One was the IBM Printer Adapter, and the other was integrated into the MDA as the IBM Monochrome Display and Printer Adapter.

=== Expansion ===
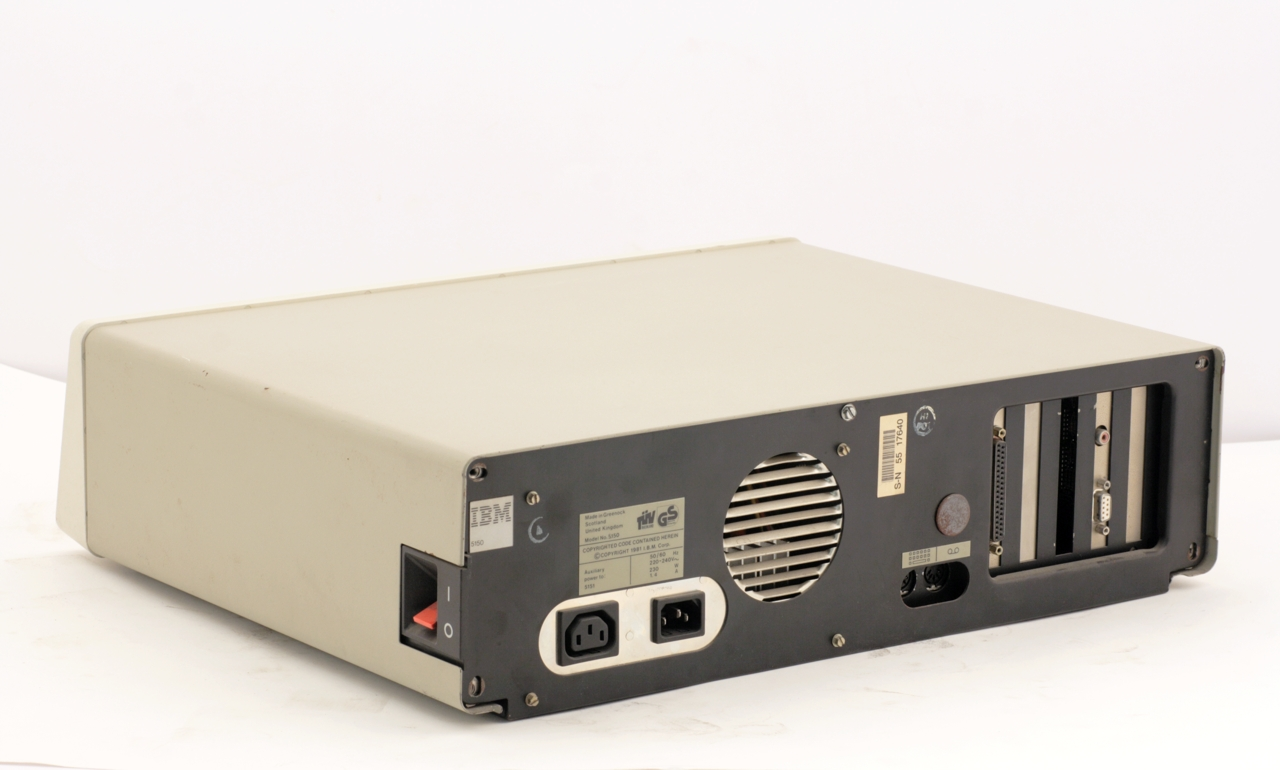
The back of a PC, showing the five expansion slots

The expansion capability of the IBM PC was very significant to its success in the market. Some publications highlighted IBM's uncharacteristic decision to publish complete, thorough specifications of the system bus and memory map immediately on release, with the intention of fostering a market of compatible third-party hardware and software.

The motherboard includes five 62-pin card edge connectors which are connected to the CPU's I/O lines. IBM referred to these as "I/O slots", but after the expansion of the PC clone industry they became retroactively known as the PC bus and later as the 8-bit ISA bus. At the back of the machine is a metal panel, integrated into the steel chassis of the system unit, with a series of vertical slots lined up with each card slot.

Most expansion cards have a matching metal bracket which slots into one of these openings, serving two purposes. First, a screw inserted through a tab on the bracket into the chassis fastens the card securely in place, preventing the card from wiggling out of place. Second, any ports the card provides for external attachment are bolted to the bracket, keeping them secured in place as well.

The PC expansion slots can accept an enormous variety of expansion hardware, adding capabilities such as:

- Graphics
- Sound
- Mouse support
- Expanded memory
- Joystick port
- Additional serial or parallel ports
- Networking
- Connection to proprietary industrial or scientific equipment

The market reacted as IBM had intended, and within a year or two of the PC's release the available options for expansion hardware were immense.

==== 5161 Expansion Unit ====
The expandability of the PC was important, but had significant limitations.

One major limitation was the inability to install a hard drive, as described above. Another was that there were only five expansion slots, which tended to get filled up by essential hardware - a PC with a graphics card, memory expansion, parallel card and serial card was left with only one open slot, for instance.

IBM rectified these problems in the later XT, which included more slots and support for an internal hard drive, but at the same time released the 5161 Expansion Unit, which could be used with either the XT or the original PC. The 5161 connected to the PC system unit using a cable and a card plugged into an expansion slot, and provided a second system chassis with more expansion slots and a hard drive.

== Software ==
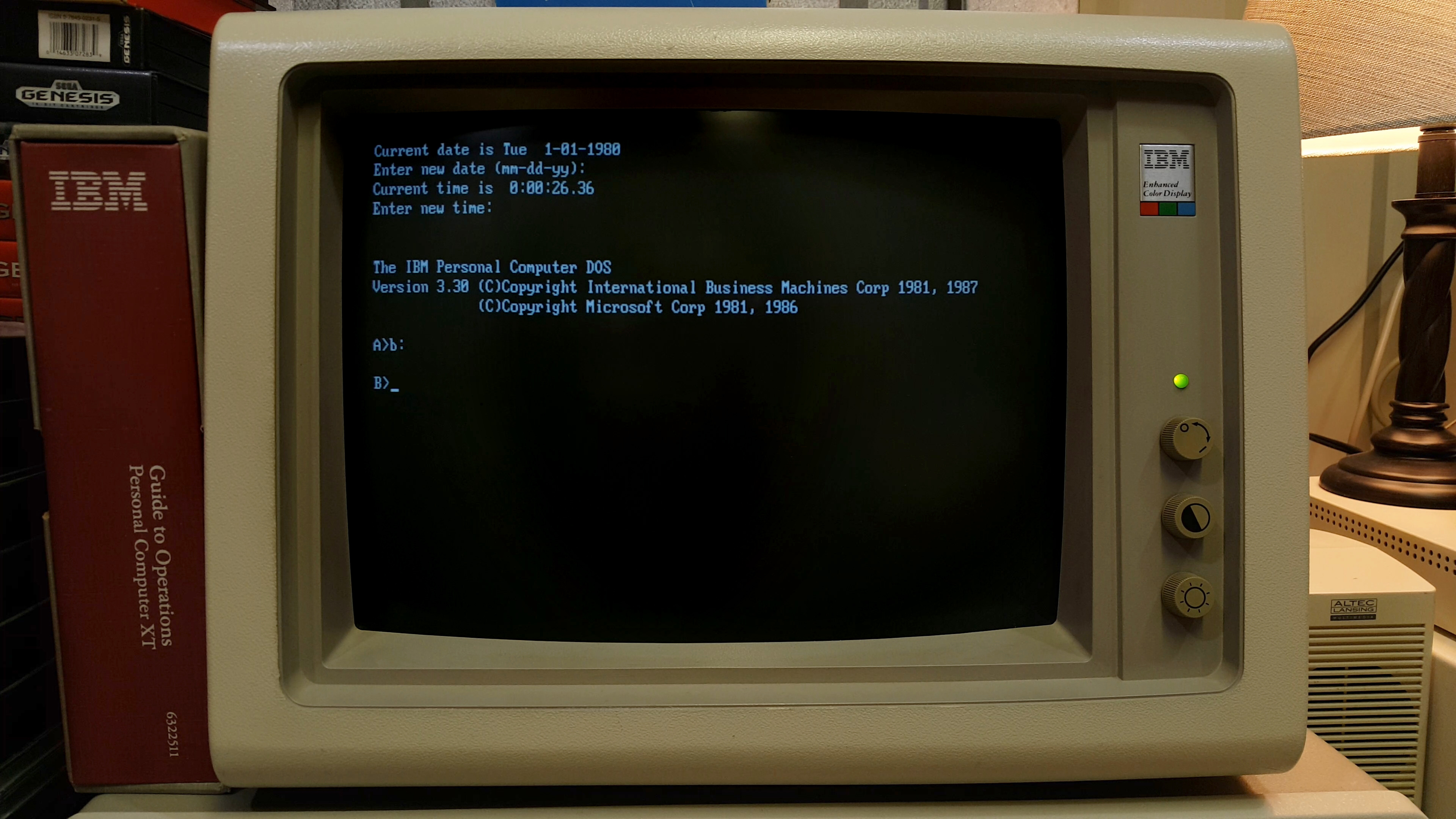
IBM PC DOS 3.30 running on an IBM PC

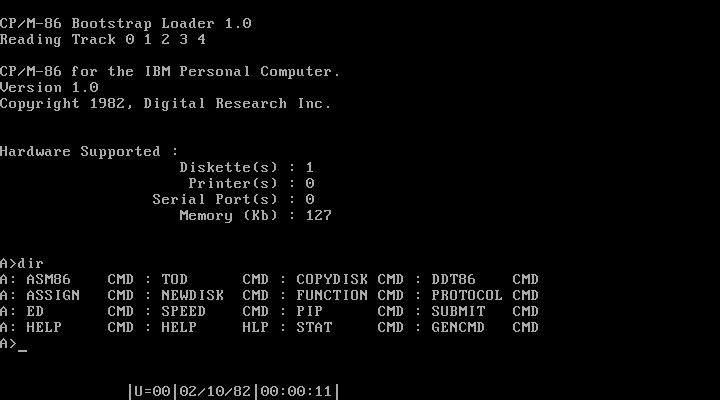
Digital Research CP/M-86 Version 1.0 for the IBM PC

IBM initially announced intent to support multiple operating systems: CP/M-86, UCSD p-System, and an in-house product called IBM PC DOS, based on 86-DOS from Seattle Computer Products and provided by Microsoft. In practice, IBM's expectation and intent was for the market to primarily use PC DOS. CP/M-86 was not available for six months after the PC's release and received extremely few orders once it was, and p-System was also not available at release. PC DOS rapidly established itself as the standard OS for the PC and remained the standard for over a decade, with a variant being sold by Microsoft themselves as MS-DOS.

The PC included BASIC in ROM (four 8 KB chips), a common feature of 1980s home computers. Its ROM BASIC supported the cassette tape interface, but PC DOS did not, limiting use of that interface to BASIC only.

PC DOS version 1.00 supported only 160 KB SSDD floppies, but version 1.1, which was released nine months after the PC's introduction, supported 160 KB SSDD and 320 KB DSDD floppies. Support for the slightly larger nine sector per track 180 KB and 360 KB formats was added in March 1983.

Third-party software support grew extremely quickly, and within a year the PC platform was supplied with a vast array of titles for any conceivable purpose.

== Reception ==
The PC improved IBM's reputation with investors, customers, and the general public. The computer's reception was extremely positive. Even before its release reviewers were impressed by the advertised specifications of the machine, and upon its release reviews praised virtually every aspect of its design both in comparison to contemporary machines and with regards to new and unexpected features.

Praise was directed at the build quality of the PC, in particular its keyboard, IBM's decision to use open specifications to encourage third party software and hardware development, their speed at delivering documentation and the quality therein, the quality of the video display, and the use of commodity components from established suppliers in the electronics industry. The price was considered extremely competitive compared to the value per dollar of competing machines.

Two years after its release, Byte magazine retrospectively concluded that the PC had succeeded both because of its features – an 80-column screen, open architecture, and high-quality keyboard – and the failure of other computer manufacturers to achieve these features first:

In retrospect, it seems IBM stepped into a void that remained, paradoxically, at the center of a crowded market.

Creative Computing that year named the PC the best desktop computer between $2,000 and $4,000, praising its vast hardware and software selection, manufacturer support, and resale value.

Many IBM PCs remained in service long after their technology became largely obsolete. For instance, as of June 2006 (23–25 years after release) IBM PC and XT models were still in use at the majority of U.S. National Weather Service upper-air observing sites, processing data returned from radiosondes attached to weather balloons.

Due to its status as the first entry in the extremely influential PC industry, the original IBM PC remains valuable as a collector's item. As of 2007, the system had a market value of $50–$500.

== Model line ==
IBM sold a number of computers under the "Personal Computer" or "PC" name throughout the 1980s. The name was not used for several years before being reused for the IBM PC Series in the 1990s and early 2000s. The PC line was replaced by the next generation IBM PS/2 in 1987 which introduced new hardware standards incompatible with those previously established by IBM and adopted in the IBM PC compatible industry. The IBM PC Series returned to the ISA standard hardware and was replaced by the IBM NetVista, which in turn was replaced by ThinkCentre models in 2003. IBM Personal Systems Group was sold to Lenovo in 2005.

The IBM PC line
Model name	Model #	Introduced	Discontinued	CPU	Features
PC	5150	August 1981	April 1987	8088	Floppy disk or cassette system. One or two internal floppy drives were optional.
XT	5160	March 1983	April 1987	8088	First IBM PC to come with an internal hard drive as standard.
XT/370	5160	October 1983	April 1987	8088	5160 with XT/370 Option Kit and 3277 Emulation Adapter.
3270 PC	5271	October 1983	April 1987	8088	With 3270 terminal emulation, 20 function key keyboard
PCjr	4860	November 1983	March 1985	8088	Floppy-based home computer, but also used ROM cartridges; infrared keyboard.
Portable	5155	February 1984	April 1986	8088	Floppy-based portable
AT	5170	August 1984	April 1987	80286	Faster processor with 24-bit address expands RAM capacity to 16 MB., faster 16 bit system bus (6 MHz, later 8 MHz, vs 4.77 MHz), jumperless configuration, real-time clock.
AT/370	5170	October 1984	April 1987	80286	5170 with AT/370 Option Kit and 3277 Emulation Adapter.
3270 AT	5281	June 1985	April 1987	80286	With 3270 terminal emulation.
Convertible	5140	April 1986	August 1989	80C88	Microfloppy laptop portable
XT 286	5162	September 1986	April 1987	80286	Slow hard disk, but zero wait state memory on the motherboard. This 6 MHz model is faster than the 8 MHz AT models (when using planar memory) because of its zero wait state memory.

As with all PC-derived systems, all IBM PC models are nominally software-compatible, although some timing-sensitive software will not run correctly on models with faster CPUs.

== Clones ==
While IBM released documentation for most of the PC's architecture in order to allow third-party manufacturers to produce compatible hardware and software, the BIOS remained IBM's proprietary intellectual property. Because the IBM PC was based on commodity hardware rather than unique IBM components, and because its operation was extensively documented by IBM, creating machines that were fully compatible with the PC presented few challenges other than the creation of a compatible BIOS ROM.

Simple duplication of the IBM PC BIOS was a direct violation of copyright law, but soon into the PC's life the BIOS was reverse-engineered with clean-room design by companies like Compaq, Phoenix Software Associates, American Megatrends and Award, who either built their own computers that could run the same software and use the same expansion hardware as the PC, or sold their BIOS code to other manufacturers who wished to build their own machines.

These machines became known as IBM compatibles or "clones", and software was widely marketed as compatible with "IBM PC or 100% compatible". Shortly thereafter, clone manufacturers began to make improvements and extensions to the hardware, such as by using faster processors like the NEC V20, which executed the same software as the 8088 at a higher speed up to 10 MHz.

The clone market eventually became so large that it lost its associations with the original PC and became a set of de facto standards established by various hardware manufacturers.

== Timeline ==
Timeline of the IBM Personal Computer

Asterisk (*) denotes a model released in Japan only
