= VisiCalc =

1979 computer spreadsheet application

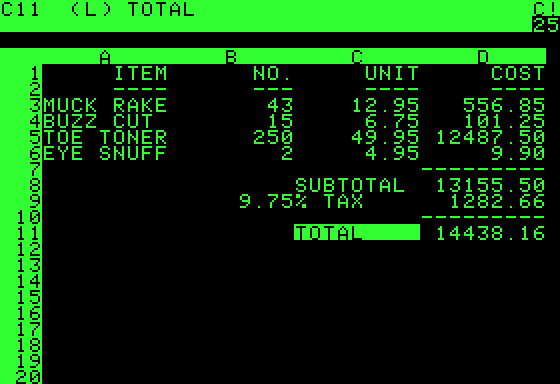
- VisiCalc spreadsheet on an Apple II
- Developers: Software Arts, published by VisiCorp
- Release: October 17, 1979; 46 years ago
- Stable release: VisiCalc Advanced Version / 1983; 43 years ago
- Operating system: Apple II, Apple SOS, Atari 8-bit, CP/M, PET, HP Series 80, MS-DOS, Sony SMC-70, TRSDOS
- Type: Spreadsheet
- License: Commercial proprietary software
- Website: danbricklin.com/visicalc.htm

VisiCalc ("visible calculator") is the first spreadsheet computer program for personal computers, originally released for the Apple II by VisiCorp on October 17, 1979. It is considered the killer application for the Apple II, turning the microcomputer from a hobby for computer enthusiasts into a serious business tool, and then prompting IBM to introduce the IBM PC two years later. More than 700,000 copies were sold in six years, and up to 1 million copies over its history.

Initially developed for the Apple II computer using a 6502 assembler running on the Multics time-sharing system, VisiCalc was ported to numerous platforms, both 8-bit and some of the early 16-bit systems. To do this, the company developed porting platforms that produced bug compatible versions. The company took the same approach when the IBM PC was launched, producing a product that was essentially identical to the original 8-bit Apple II version. Sales were initially brisk, with about 300,000 copies sold.

VisiCalc uses the A1 notation in formulas.

When Lotus 1-2-3 was launched in 1983, taking full advantage of the larger memory capacity (up to 256 KB) and 80-column screen of the IBM PC, versus 64 KB on the 40-column Apple II Plus, VisiCalc sales declined so rapidly that the company was soon insolvent. In 1985, Lotus Development purchased the company and ended sales of VisiCalc.

== History ==
VISICALC represented a new idea of a way to use a computer and a new way of thinking about the world. Where conventional programming was thought of as a sequence of steps, this new thing was no longer sequential in effect: When you made a change in one place, all other things changed instantly and automatically.

— Ted Nelson

Dan Bricklin conceived of VisiCalc while watching a presentation at Harvard Business School (HBS). The professor was creating a financial model on a blackboard that was ruled with vertical and horizontal lines (resembling accounting paper) to create a table, and he wrote formulas and data into the cells. When the professor found an error or wanted to change a parameter, he had to erase and rewrite several sequential entries in the table. Bricklin realized that he could replicate the process on a computer using an "electronic spreadsheet" to view results of underlying formulae.

Although a HBS professor warned Bricklin that large computers already had much financial modeling software, Bob Frankston joined Bricklin at 231 Broadway, Arlington, Massachusetts. The pair formed the Software Arts company, and developed the VisiCalc program in two months during the winter of 1978–79. Bricklin wrote:

with the years of experience we had at the time we created VisiCalc, we were familiar with many row/column financial programs. In fact, Bob had worked since the 1960s at Interactive Data Corporation, a major timesharing utility that was used for some of them and I was exposed to some at Harvard Business School in one of the classes.

Bricklin was referring to the variety of report generators that were in use at that time, including Business Planning Language (BPL) from International Timesharing Corporation (ITS) and Foresight from Foresight Systems. However, these earlier timesharing programs were not completely interactive, and they pre-dated personal computers. Frankston and Bricklin took a bank loan to purchase a Prime minicomputer, on which they wrote the development tools (editor, assembler, linker) they used to write VisiCalc.

Frankston described VisiCalc as a "magic sheet of paper that can perform calculations and recalculations [which] allows the user to just solve the problem using familiar tools and concepts". The Personal Software company began selling VisiCalc in mid-1979 for under US$100 (equivalent to $440 in 2025), after a demonstration at the fourth West Coast Computer Faire and an official launch on June 4 at the National Computer Conference. It requires an Apple II with 32K of random-access memory (RAM), and supports saving files to magnetic tape cassette or to the Apple Disk II floppy disk system.

Many in the microcomputer industry had expected that their products would grow in power until they could run the large software library available for minicomputers, but VisiCalc had no equivalent on bigger computers. It had functionality similar to financial modeling languages that cost $20,000, but did not require learning a language. VisiCalc was unusually easy to use and came with excellent documentation. Apple's developer documentation cited the software as an example of one with a simple user interface. Benefiting from personal computers' interactivity, the software uses the familiar metaphor of locations on a spreadsheet and invites iterative development. As a general-purpose application it does not force a particular solution, and is usable for almost any purpose. Observers immediately noticed its power. Noting how those new to computers quickly learned the application, Ben Rosen speculated in July 1979 that "VisiCalc could someday become the software tail that wags (and sells) the personal computer dog".

=== Killer app ===
Rosen was correct. For the first 12 months VisiCalc was only available for Apple II, and became its killer app. John Markoff wrote that the computer was sold as a "VisiCalc accessory"; businessmen visiting computer stores saw the software, understood its usefulness, and wanted to buy it immediately. When told that the $100 VisiCalc required a $2,000 (equivalent to $8,900 in 2025) Apple II, customers added the computer to the order — more than 25% of Apple IIs sold in 1979 were reportedly for VisiCalc — even if they already owned other computers. Steve Wozniak said that small businesses, not the hobbyists he and Steve Jobs had expected, purchased 90% of Apple IIs; Apple dealers said that VisiCalc had caused more business computer sales than all other software combined.

Bricklin and Frankston originally intended to fit the program into 16k memory, but they later realized that the program needed at least 32k. Even 32k is too small to support some features that the creators wanted to include, such as a split screen for text and graphics. However, Apple eventually began shipping all Apple IIs with 48k memory following a drop in RAM prices, enabling the developers to include more features. The initial release supported tape cassette storage, but that was quickly dropped. Other software supports its Data Interchange Format (DIF) to share data. One example is the Microsoft BASIC interpreter supplied with most microcomputers that ran VisiCalc. This allowed skilled BASIC programmers to write features, such as trigonometric functions, that VisiCalc lacked.

Apple's rival Tandy Corporation used VisiCalc on Apple IIs at their headquarters. At VisiCalc's release, Personal Software promised to port the program to other computers, starting with those with the MOS Technology 6502 microprocessor, and versions appeared for Atari 8-bit computers and Commodore PET. Both of those were easy, because those computers have the same CPU as Apple II, and large portions of code were reused. The PET version, which contains two separate executables for 40 and 80-column models, was widely criticized for having a very small amount of worksheet space due to the developers' inclusion of their own custom DOS, which uses a large amount of memory. The PET only has 32k versus Apple II's available 48k.

Other ports followed for Apple III, the Zilog Z80-based Tandy TRS-80 Model I, Model II, Model III, Model 4, and Sony SMC-70. The TRS-80 Model I and Sony SMC-70 ports are the only versions of VisiCalc without copy protection. The HP 125 and Sony SMC-70 ports are the only CP/M version. Most versions are disk-based, but the PET VisiCalc came with a ROM chip that the user must install in one of the motherboard's expansion ROM sockets. The most important port is for the IBM PC, and VisiCalc became one of the first commercial packages available when the IBM PC shipped in 1981. It quickly became a best-seller on this platform, though severely limited to be compatible with the versions for the 8-bit platforms. It is estimated that 300,000 copies were sold on the PC, bringing total sales to about 1 million copies.

Personal Software renamed itself VisiCorp in 1982. By that year, VisiCalc's price had risen from $100 to $250 (equivalent to $830 in 2025). More than 39,000 copies were sold in January 1983, with it still the best-selling software product. Several competitors appeared in the market, such as SuperCalc and Multiplan, each of which have more features and corrected deficiencies in VisiCalc, but could not overcome its market dominance.

=== Decline ===
A more dramatic change occurred with the 1983 launch of Lotus Development Corporation's Lotus 1-2-3, created by former Personal Software/VisiCorp employee Mitch Kapor, who had written VisiTrend and VisiPlot. Unlike the IBM PC version of VisiCalc, 1-2-3 was written to take full advantage of the PC's increased memory, screen, and performance. Yet it was designed to be as compatible as possible with VisiCalc, including the menu structure, to allow VisiCalc users to easily migrate to 1-2-3.

1-2-3 was almost immediately successful, while VisiCalc sales declined to 5,700 copies in December 1983. In 1984, InfoWorld stated that it was "the first successful software product to have gone through a complete life cycle, from conception in 1978 to introduction in 1979 to peak success in 1982 to decline in 1983 to a probable death according to industry insiders in 1984". The magazine added that the company was slow to upgrade the software, in part due to the choice to focus their update on the ill-fated Apple III; the Advanced Version of VisiCalc for Apple III came out in 1982. Only in 1983 did a version come out for Apple II, with a version for the IBM PC being announced (but not delivered) in 1984. VisiCorp sued Software Arts in September 1983; the lawsuit and countersuit focused on the VisiCalc trademark. The two companies settled in September 1984; VisiCorp paid $500,000 in royalties to Software Arts, which received the VisiCalc trademark but not rights to the "Visi" prefix. VisiCorp could continue to use "Visi" with other software. By 1985, VisiCorp was insolvent. Lotus Development acquired Software Arts, and ended sales of the application.

=== VisiCalc ===
- 1979: Apple II
- 1980: Apple III, TRS-80 Model II, TRS-80 Model III, Commodore PET, HP 125, Atari 8-bit
- 1981: IBM PC, Sony SMC-70

=== VisiCalc Advanced ===
- 1982: Apple III
- 1983: Apple IIe
- 1983: TRS-80 Model 4, Model II (with RAM expansion card) and Model 16. Used banked memory beyond the base 64 KB.
- 1984: IBM PC

== Reception ==
In its 1980 review, BYTE wrote "The most exciting and influential piece of software that has been written for any microcomputer application is VisiCalc [...] VisiCalc is the first program available on a microcomputer that has been responsible for sales of entire systems". Creative Computing's review that year similarly concluded, "for almost anyone in business, education, or any science-related field it is [...] reason enough to purchase a small computer system in the first place". Compute! reported, "Every Visicalc user knows of someone who purchased an Apple just to be able to use Visicalc". In 1983, Softline readers named VisiCalc tenth overall and the highest non-game on the magazine's Top Thirty list of Atari 8-bit programs by popularity. Antic wrote in 1984, "VisiCalc isn't as easy to use as prepackaged home accounting programs, because you're required to design both the layout and the formulas used by the program. Because it is not pre-packaged, however, it's infinitely more powerful and flexible than such programs. You can use VisiCalc to balance your checkbook, keep track of credit card purchases, calculate your net worth, do your taxes—the possibilities are practically limitless." The Addison-Wesley Book of Atari Software 1984 gave the application an overall A+ rating, praising its documentation and calling it "indispensable ... a straight 'A' classic". II Computing listed it second on the magazine's list of top Apple II software as of late 1985, based on sales and market-share data. In 2006, Charles Babcock of InformationWeek wrote that, in retrospect, "VisiCalc was flawed and clunky, and couldn't do many things users wanted it to do", but also, "It's great because it demonstrated the power of personal computing".

In 1999, HBS put up a plaque commemorating Dan Bricklin in the room where he had studied: "Forever changed how people use computers in business". Since 2010, the anniversary of the October 17, 1979, launch of VisiCalc has been celebrated as Spreadsheet Day.

== Legacy ==
VisiCalc is one of the earliest examples of metaphor-driven user interface design, due to its resemblance with paper spreadsheets. This metaphor made the program comprehensible and familiar to accountants, economists, and bookkeepers who were not used to using computers, and VisiCalc's release marked the point where "personal computers crossed the line from a hobbyist obsession to a compelling tool". Compared to paper spreadsheets, VisiCalc freed users to change numbers without having to recalculate the whole spreadsheet by hand, which, according to Steven Levy, "changed the perception of a spreadsheet from a document of hard costs into a modeling tool by which one tested business scenarios".

== See also ==
- Visi On
- Triumph of the Nerds, a documentary hosted by Robert X. Cringely featuring the creators of VisiCalc and their contribution as the first killer app for the personal computer
- Timeline of computing 1950–1979
