= Flexidraw =

Flexidraw is a 1985 graphics computer program published by Inkwell Systems.

== Gameplay ==
Flexidraw is a graphics program that allows users to produce drawings using a light pen and print them.

== Reception ==
Roy Wagner reviewed the product for Computer Gaming World, and stated that "Of the many graphics programs available Flexidraw is certainly the best supported by it's [sic] parent company."
