= Aldo's Adventure =

1987 MS-DOS platform game

Aldo's Adventure is a 1987 platform game released as shareware for MS-DOS. It was developed by David and Benjamin Ibach under Yahoo Software.

== Gameplay ==
The player controls the titular character, Aldo, using the arrow keys to move and the spacebar to jump, which can also be executed while running. The primary objective in each level is to reach a treasure chest located at the top of the screen before time expires. Along the way, players can collect bonus items such as diamonds, amphoras, and money bags to restore a portion of the time limit and earn extra points. The player starts with a total of four or five lives depending on settings and difficulty.

In addition to rolling barrels, obstacles include burning pits, low-clearance ceilings that prevent jumping, and fragile platform tiles that collapse after being stepped on twice. Later stages increase the challenge; for instance, the second level (titled "Long Island") introduces barrels spawning simultaneously from two separate sources, while the third level requires reaching two treasures instead of one.

== Development and release ==
Aldo's Adventure was developed specifically to take advantage of the Enhanced Graphics Adapter (EGA) standard, offering a color palette for PC standards in 1987. The game required MS-DOS version 2.0 or higher and an IBM PC/AT compatible system (excluding models 25 and 30) equipped with at least an EGA or VGA color display.

The title was distributed via the shareware model, allowing for widespread distribution through Bulletin Board System (BBS) networks, mail-order floppy disk vendors, and magazine compilations. It was made available on both 5.25-inch and 3.5-inch floppy disks.

In Europe, companies such as Redysoft Software GmbH distributed the title as early as late 1988, marketing it as a "brand new top hit from the USA". In the United States, it was featured in mail-order catalogs including California Freeware (1989) and MicroTimes (1991) for around $3 per disk. International distributors also offered the game in local currencies and bundled packages; for instance, the Australian magazine Your Computer included Aldo's Adventure in its "Dynamite Pack #3" disk collection in March 1991, while Finnish listings in early 1993 offered the game on 3.5-inch Double Density (DD) floppy disks for 15.90 FIM.

== Reception ==
Contemporary gaming and computing publications praised Aldo's Adventure for its visual presentation and engaging platforming gameplay. As early as late 1988, media coverage highlighted the game's visuals; the German magazine DOS International commended its "excellent graphics", while an IBM Special Edition of Byte praised its "super graphics" and the US magazine Compute! highlighted its "professional quality" graphics.

In July 1989, the German magazine Joystick noted that the jump-and-run game would find great appeal among platforming fans. The German publication ST-Computer included the game among a curated selection of the best public domain and shareware titles for IBM PC/XT and AT systems. The following year, DOS-Trend praised the title as a "really nice PC game for the whole family", highlighting its responsive controls and "very pretty graphics".

Coverage continued into the early 1990s, frequently drawing direct comparisons to Nintendo's arcade titles. The Italian magazine Videogame & Computer World described the game as a shareware version of Donkey Kong, joking that Aldo's objective was to rescue a girl due to the resemblance between the two games. Echoing this sentiment, the US publication VideoGames & Computer Entertainment noted that the game "follows in the footsteps set by Mario in Donkey Kong" and both Finnish publications Microsoft Magazine and Pelit lauded the title, describing it as a "really competent challenger to Donkey Kong".

== Sequels ==
Aldo's Adventure was followed by two direct sequels: Aldo Again and Aldo's Assault (also known as Aldo3).
