= Holborn (disambiguation) =

Holborn is an area of Central London, England.

Holborn may also refer to:

- Holborn District (Metropolis), a former local government district in the metropolitan area of London
- Metropolitan Borough of Holborn, a former local government district in the County of London
- Holborn division, a former subdivision of Ossulstone, Middlesex, in England
- Holborn (London County Council constituency), a former constituency
- Holborn (UK Parliament constituency), a former parliamentary constituency centred on the Holborn district of Central London
- Holborn tramway station, a tram stop underneath Kingsway in central London
- Holborn tube station, a station of the London Underground
- Holborn, an area in the Lower Hutt suburb of Stokes Valley in New Zealand
- Holborn, a defunct Dutch computer manufacturer that produced the Holborn 9100 series

== People with the surname ==
- Abbie Holborn, British reality television personality
- Demi Holborn (b. 1992), Welsh singer
- Hajo Holborn (1902–1969), German-American historian
  - Hanna Holborn Gray (b. 1930), daughter of Hajo Holborn, German-American historian

Fictional characters:

- Jack Holborn, the main character of the television miniseries Jack Holborn

== See also ==
- Holborn Head
- Holborn Hill
- Old Holborn, tobacco
