= Light pen =

Computer input device

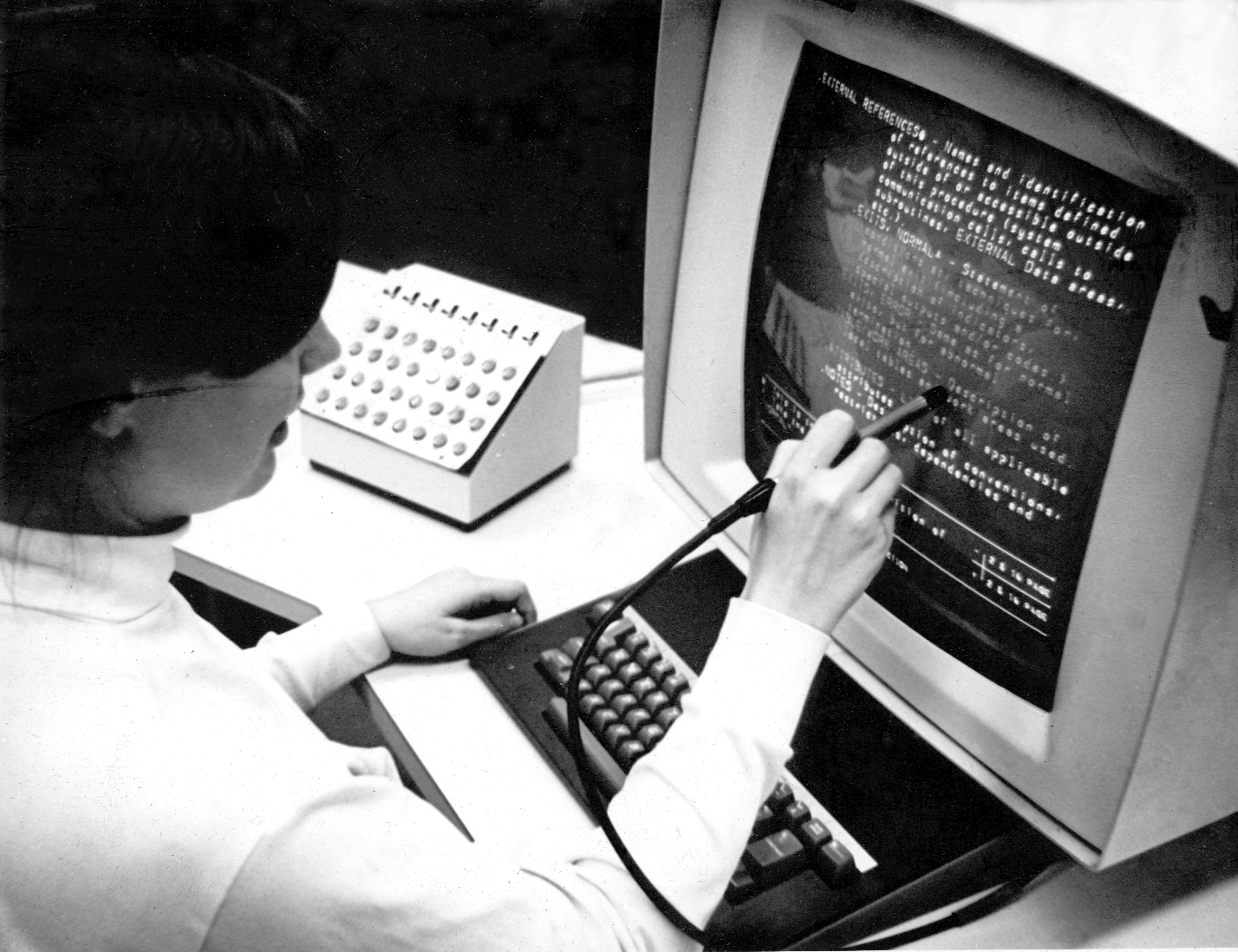
Photo of the Hypertext Editing System (HES) console in use at Brown University, circa October 1969. The photo shows HES on an IBM 2250 Mod 4 display station, including lightpen and programmed function keyboard, channel coupled to Brown's IBM 360 mainframe.

A light pen is a computer input device in the form of a light-sensitive wand used in conjunction with a cathode-ray tube (CRT) display.

Like a touchscreen, a light pen allows the user to point to displayed graphic elements such as menus or buttons, or even draw directly on the screen. However, while a touchscreen acts as a sensor to detect a fingertip or stylus, a light pen serves as the sensor itself, detecting the light emitted by the CRT's phosphors.

Light pens are compatible with both vector-based and raster-based CRT displays. As a CRT's electron beam traverses the screen, it excites a phosphor coating within the CRT, causing it to glow. If this occurs directly under the tip of the pen, a photosensitive component such as a photodiode causes a timing signal to be sent to the computer. Using either the known position of the beam at that precise moment (in a vector-based system), or the time since the last horizontal or vertical synchronization pulses (in a raster-based system), the exact position of the pen can be derived.

== History ==
The first light pen, at this time still called a "light gun", was created around 1951–1955 as part of the Whirlwind I project at MIT, where it was used to select discrete symbols on the screen. Light pens were a component of the SAGE system, assisting in tactical real-time-control of radar-networked airspace.

One of the first more widely deployed uses was in the Situation Display consoles of the AN/FSQ-7 for military airspace surveillance. This is not very surprising, given its relationship with the Whirlwind projects. See Semi-Automatic Ground Environment for more details.

During the 1960s, light pens were common on graphics terminals such as the IBM 2250, and were also available for the IBM 3270 text-only terminal.

The first nonlinear video editor, the CMX 600, was controlled by a light pen. The system came with two black and white monitors, where the light pen was used to interact with text superimposed over the preview video on the right monitor.

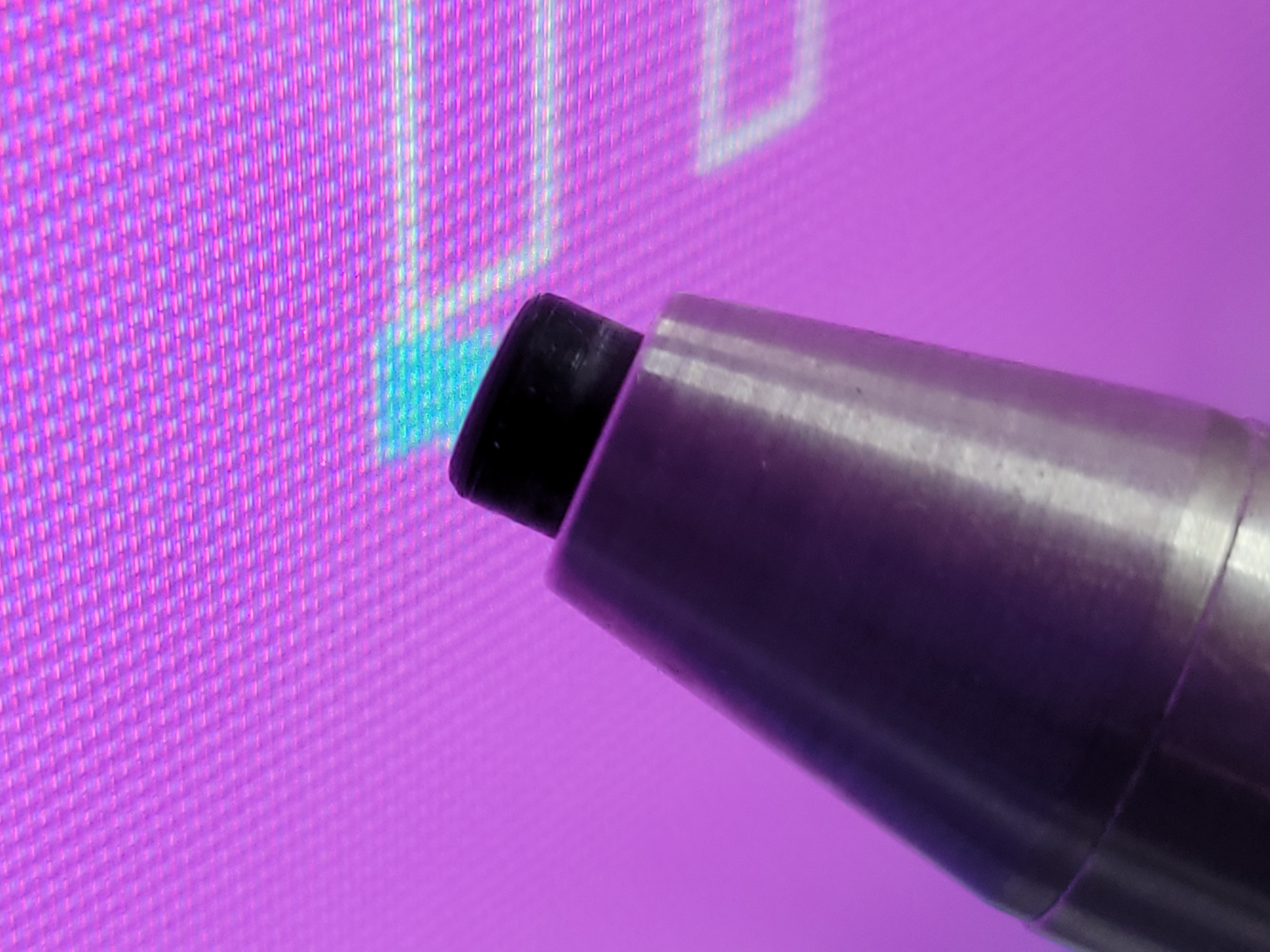
Photo of a "Warp Speed" light pen interacting with a graphics program running on a Tandy 1000 computer.

Light pen usage was expanded in the early 1980s to music workstations, such as the Fairlight CMI, and personal computers such as the BBC Micro and Holborn 9100. IBM PC-compatible MDA (only early versions), CGA, HGC (including HGC+ and InColor) and some EGA graphics cards also featured a connector compatible with a light pen, as did early Tandy 1000 computers, (Note: For example, the Tandy 1000 SX has a DE-9 light pen connector on the rear panel; on the later-introduced Tandy 1000 TX, this light pen interface has been replaced with a serial port using the same connector in the same location.) the Thomson MO5 computer family, the Amiga, Atari 8-bit, Commodore 8-bit, some MSX computers and Amstrad PCW home computers. For the MSX computers, Sanyo produced a light pen interface cartridge.

Because the user was required to hold their arm in front of the screen for long periods of time (potentially causing "gorilla arm"), or to use a desk that tilts the monitor, the light pen fell out of use as a general-purpose input device. The light pen was also perceived as working well only on displays with low persistence, which tend to flicker.

== See also ==
- Bit banging
- CueCat
- Digital pen
- Light gun
- Pen computing
- Stylus (computing)
