= Game Theater XP =

The Game Theater XP (a.k.a. GTXP) is a sound card which was developed and manufactured by Hercules. It was first available in the United States in 2001. As of July 2006, it is no longer available on their website. Over the years the GTXP has picked up somewhat of a cult following from computer audiophiles all over the world

== See also ==
- Sound card
- Sensaura (owned by Creative Technology)
- Creative Technology
- Hercules Computer Technology
