= Hercules Computer Technology =

Former computer peripheral company

- Industry: Computer peripherals
- Founded: 1982; 44 years ago
- Founder: Van Suwannukul; Kevin Jenkins
- Defunct: 1998
- Fate: Acquired by Guillemot Corporation

Hercules Computer Technology, Inc. was a manufacturer of computer peripherals for PCs and Macs founded in 1982.

== History ==
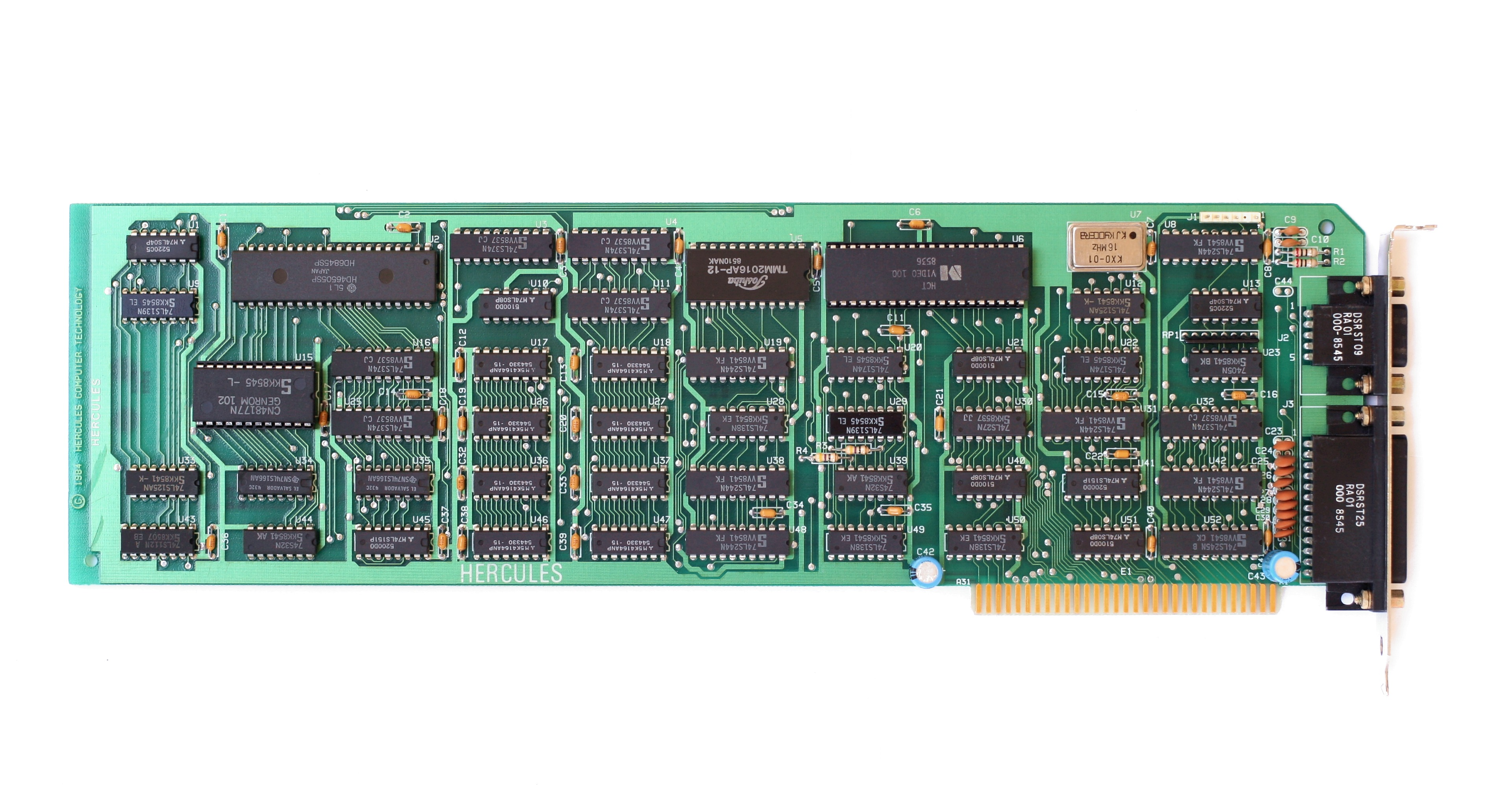
The Hercules Graphics Card (1984)

Hercules Stingray

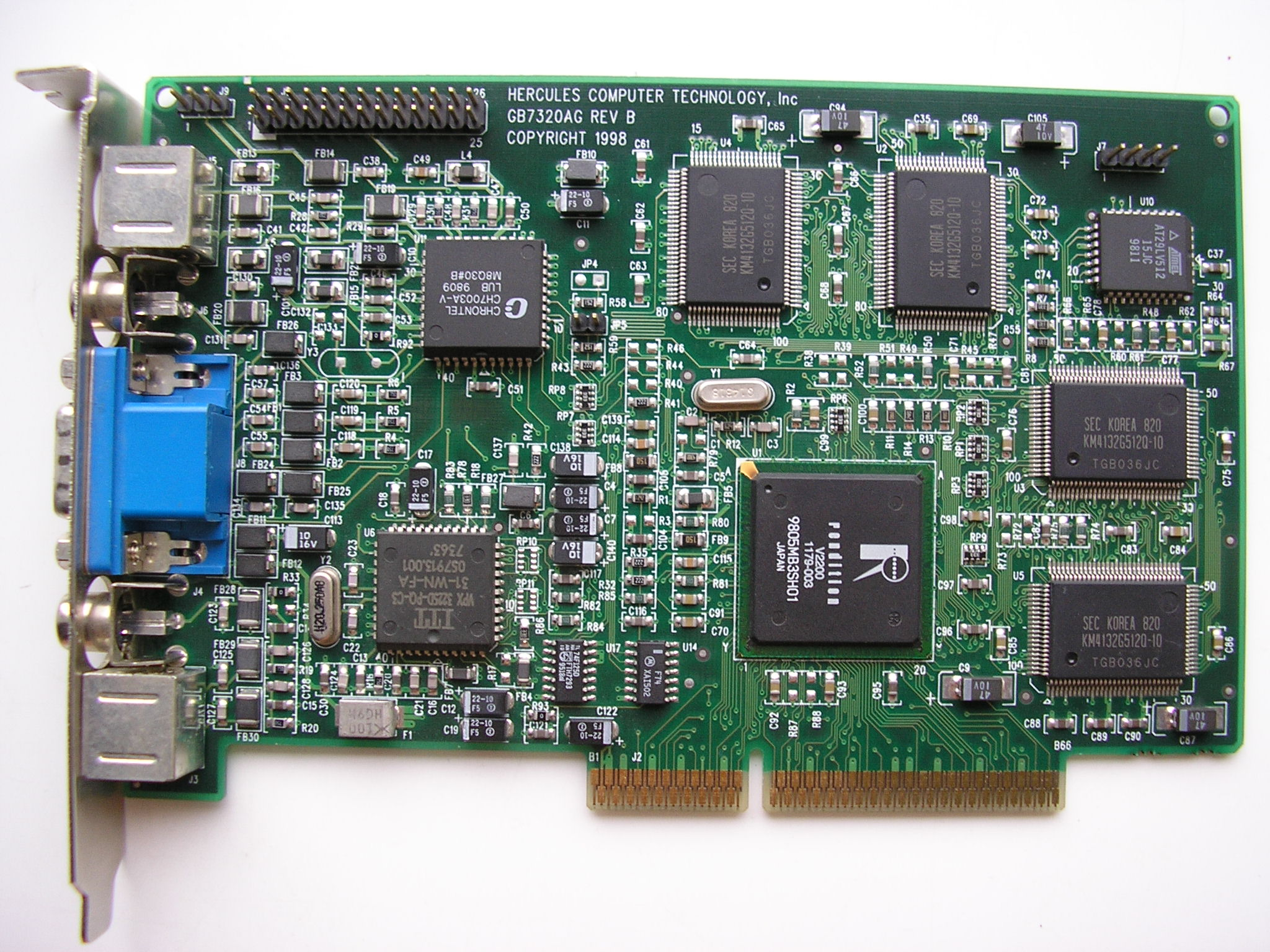
Hercules Thriller 3D TH2318SGA Rendition Vérité v2200, AGP, 8MB SGRAM, Video In & Video Out (1998)

Hercules Computer Technology (HCT) was formed in 1982 in Hercules, California, by Van Suwannukul and Kevin Jenkins and was one of the major graphics card companies of the 1980s. Its biggest products were the MDA-compatible Hercules Graphics Card (HGC) and Hercules Graphics Card Plus (HGC+) and the associated standard, which was widely copied and survived into the 1990s. By the first half of 1986 HCT had 50% of the monochrome-graphics market; its 18% of the overall graphics card market was second to IBM, which benefited from selling its cards with its computers.

The Hercules Graphics Card includes a Centronics-compatible parallel printer port, the same as the IBM Monochrome Display and Printer Adapter board that the card was based on. HCT also produced CGA compatible cards, and with the unsuccessful Hercules InColor Card, it tried to go head-to-head with the Enhanced Graphics Adapter (EGA).

After low sales with InColor, HCT stopped making its own graphics core and bought graphics chipsets from other manufacturers. The company name gradually declined through the 1990s while graphics chipsets firms such as Tseng Labs, S3 Graphics, 3Dfx, nVidia and ATI Technologies became popular, but sales of graphic cards were still at US$20 million in 1998. An acquisition of HCT by German graphics card maker ELSA fell through in 1998 after the companies could not agree on terms.

=== Brand acquisition by Guillemot ===
The Hercules brand was acquired by the French-Canadian based Guillemot Corporation for $1.8 million. In 2000 Hercules became the brand name for Guillemot 3D Prophet graphic cards, based on nVIDIA chipsets, switching to ATI Technologies chipsets in 2002.

Also in 2000, Guillemot introduced a new sound card, Game Theater XP, with the Hercules brand name, and Hercules gradually became the computer peripherals brand in Guillemot Corporation.

In 2004, Guillemot announced it would cease to produce graphics cards. Within the Guillemot group, computer peripherals (audio interfaces, speakers, webcams, networking) are designed by the Hercules division and given the Hercules brand, while game peripherals are designed by the Thrustmaster division and receive the Thrustmaster brand.

In 2010, the Hercules brand was used on computer speakers, computer DJ controllers, webcams and wireless networking peripherals.

Hercules turnover was €40.9 million (US$56.5 million) in 2010.

== Organization ==
- Headquarters: in France (President: Claude Guillemot),
- Research and development: offices in Canada, France, Hong-Kong and Romania,
- Sales: via Guillemot sales branches in Belgium, France, Germany, Italy, Netherlands, Spain, UK, USA,
- Distribution to retailers: through distributors,
- Technical support: customer phone and email support by Guillemot technical support team.

== Products ==
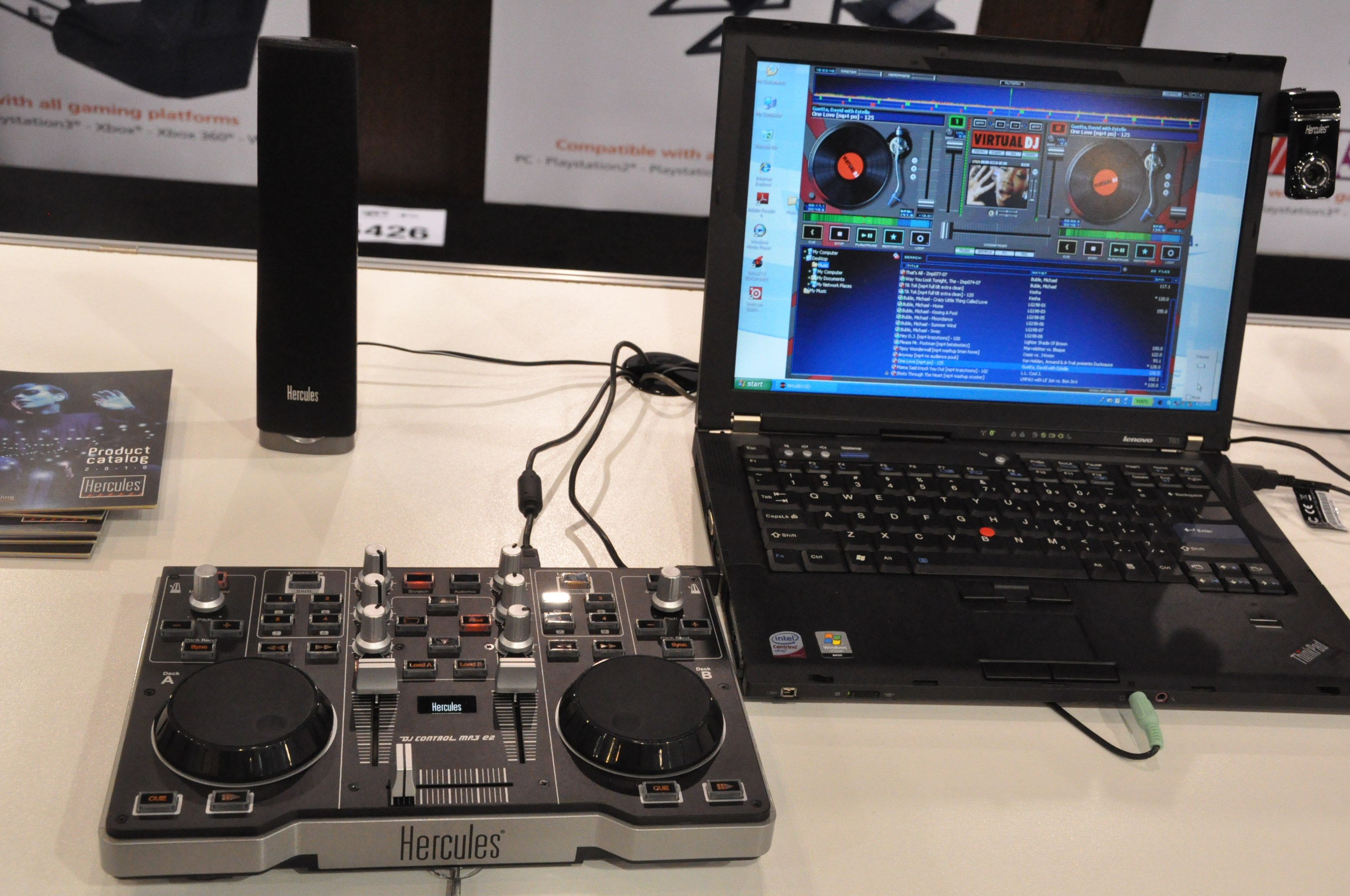
Hercules DJ mixer

- Computer DJing: DJ Console – controllers with audio interface (DJ Console Mk2, Mk4, Rmx, 4-Mx) / DJ Control = DJ controllers without audio (DJ Control MP3, MP3 e2, Steel)
- Netbooks: eCafe ec-800, 900, 1000W, 1010W
- Speakers: XPS: Stereo, 2.1, for iPod and 5.1
- Webcams: DualPix: Classic, Infinite, Exchange, Emotion
- Networking: Wireless (WiFi) and ePlug (PowerLine)

=== Former products: Graphic cards ===
- Hercules based: Hercules Graphics Card (HGC), Hercules Graphics Card Plus (HGC+ with RAMFONT), Hercules InColor Card, Hercules Network Card Plus, Hercules Color Card
- Tseng Labs based: Dynamite Pro
- Rendition based: Thriller 3D
- ARK Logic based: Stingray 64
- 3Dfx based: Stingray 128/3D
- S3 based: Terminator Professional, 64, Beast, Beast SuperCharged
- Intel based: Terminator 2x/i (i740)
- nVidia based: Dynamite (before 1999) TNT, TNT2, TNT2 Ultra
- nVidia based: Maxi Gamer Phoenix & Xentor (TNT, TNT2, Vanta)
- nVidia based: 3D Prophet (after 2000) DDR-DVI, 3D Prophet 2, 2-Mx, 2 Ultra, 3
- ATI based: 3D Prophet 7000, 7500, 8500, 9200, 9500, 9600, 9700
- ST Kyro based: 3D Prophet 4000, 4000XT, 4500

=== Former products: Sound cards ===
- DIGIFIRE 7.1
- Guillemot Maxi Sound Muse
- Hercules Gamesurround Muse Pocket USB
- Hercules Game Theater XP 6.1, 7.1
- Hercules Gamesurround Muse XL
- Hercules Gamesurround Muse LT
- Hercules Gamesurround Muse 5.1 DVD
- Hercules Gamesurround Fortissimo II Digital Edition
- Hercules Gamesurround Fortissimo III 7.1
