= The Crimson Diamond =

2024 video game

Crimson Diamond
- Developer: Julia Minamata
- Publisher: Julia Minamata
- Composer: Dan Policar
- Platforms: macOS, Windows
- Release: August 15, 2024
- Genre: Adventure
- Mode: Single-player

The Crimson Diamond is a 2024 mystery adventure video game developed and published by Julia Minamata for the PC. The game features a text parser, requiring players to solve a mystery through inputting instructions via text to the game. Solo developer Julia Minamata designed the game featuring an EGA color palette, inspired by the adventure games she enjoyed in her youth like The Colonel's Bequest.

Reception to The Crimson Diamond has been positive, with reviewers praising it as a strong homage to past adventure titles with modern features, despite noting that some puzzle solutions could be too challenging.

== Plot ==
Set in 1914, the game follows Nancy Maple, a rookie geologist working for the Royal Canadian Museum. She is tasked with investigating a diamond that was found in a fish at Crimson, Ontario, a fictional garnet mining town that has fallen on hard times. Eager to prove herself to her male colleagues, many of whom refuse to recognize her as a geologist, Nancy boards a train to Crimson with the intent to stay at the Crimson Lodge. During the trip she meets Kimi Kishiro, who is also traveling to Crimson to study the local bird population, particularly the cormorants.

Nancy Maple eavesdrops on a conversation in the Crimson Lodge. This cutscene starts after the player inputs an "Eavesdrop" command at a specific location in the game.

When she arrives Nancy discovers that another geologist, Albert Respa, has also arrived, having been sent to Crimson by the Canadian government. Nancy and Kimi are told by lodge caretaker Jack Precord that the Crimson Lodge is no longer in operation and that while they can stay the night, they must leave the following morning. That night Nancy meets Evan Richards, the wealthy owner of the Crimson Lodge, his girlfriend Margot, Evan's sister Nessa, Evan's friend Nathan Cardinal, and Nessa's lawyer Corvus Shaw. The following morning Nancy learns that the bridge leading out of Crimson has been destroyed, stranding her and Kimi at the lodge. Nancy sets about her work, during which time she learns more about the issues between Evan and Nessa, as well as gaining evidence that suggests that there are indeed diamonds in Crimson.

Later that night Margot dies under mysterious circumstances and Nancy decides to investigate. During the course of the investigation she discovers that Nessa poisoned Margot out of jealousy and in an attempt to ensure that Evan does not bequeath the lodge and lands to Margot. Ultimately Nancy learns that Nessa is also planning to kill Evan so she can inherit everything. Nancy follows clues to the mines, where Nessa has Evan bound.

Depending on how players progress, they can reach different endings. In the true ending Nessa does not die and is arrested due to Nancy obtaining all of the necessary evidence. Nancy chooses not to disclose that Crimson has diamonds as this will decimate the town's ecology. She receives a letter from Evan informing her that he has left his lands to Nathan and gives her directions to a buried treasure Margot had hidden away along with a letter that confirms her love for Crimson and Evan. In the bad ending Nancy informs her employer and the news that Crimson is full of diamonds. The government seizes the lands from Evan and Nathan's families, destroying their homes in order to mine diamonds. In a third ending, if Nancy does not successfully defeat Nessa, the woman ties Nancy up and murders Evan. Nancy survives, but Nessa manages to escape and disappear. Nathan inherits the lodge and properties, however the lodge is eventually reclaimed by nature.

== Gameplay ==
The player navigates the game by using a text parser to direct Nancy's actions, inputting various text commands to interact with her environment. This system allows for a wide range of interactions, offering flexibility in how the player engages with the world. For example, the command "Look at desk" might prompt the game to describe the desk, noting two drawers and various items on top. The player can then choose to examine these items further, with the game providing detailed text descriptions of each. The text parser is relatively flexible, allowing multiple verbs to arrive at the same point for finding solutions to puzzles. Progression through the game requires the player to solve mysteries and use the text parser to find clues that help them advance the plot. A notebook allows the player to automatically keep track of clues and evidence they have received. The game is designed to take at least 7 hours to reach the finale.

== Development ==
Julia Minamata, the solo developer for the game, spent a decade working as a freelance illustrator for publications like The New Yorker before pivoting to developing The Crimson Diamond. Minamata had played adventure games like The Colonel's Bequest, Quest for Glory and The Secret of Monkey Island as a child and read books like Agatha Christie and The Hardy Boys. After discovering the free Adventure Game Studio, Minamata realized that developing a game was more accessible than she had expected with modern tools, and set out to create a game. She initially started illustrating using pixel graphics in her free time to recreate scenes like those from games in her youth like The Colonel's Bequest, creating rooms and furniture in the style. To ensure that the illustrations were to scale, she added a character to the scene – and as she made the character walk around, she realized she was beginning to develop a game. She finished creating a full pixel art-style house first, deciding to create a mystery that took place inside of it afterwards.

Minamata wanted to avoid the need for the regular use of a hint book inside the game, hoping to avoid punishing puzzles that Sierra games from her childhood sometimes featured. She decided to use an EGA color palette because its limitations force artists to put a perspective on how the world is perceived, instead of recreating reality.

== Reception ==
Reception

Aggregate scores
Aggregator	Score
Metacritic	88/100
OpenCritic	89% recommend

The Crimson Diamond received "generally favorable" reviews from critics, according to the review aggregation website Metacritic. Fellow review aggregator OpenCritic assessed that the game received "mighty" approval, being recommended by 89% of critics.

Reception to the game has been positive from critics, who praised the text parser's flexibility in particular. Alice Bell of Rock Paper Shotgun called The Crimson Diamond a "beautiful piece of work" and praised the modern implementation of old systems while lamenting some specifically difficult puzzles that she struggled with. Kenzie Du of Adventure Gamers praised the game's depth and the game's unique graphical style, calling it a "wonderful game." In a review of his impressions of the game's opening, Kevin Purdy of Ars Technica praised the game's visuals and sound design, noting that the EGA graphic restrictions created a beautiful visual for the game's story. A PC Gamer review of the game's demo by Tom Sykes praised the game's more modern text parser system, calling it "a neat balance between the flexibility of parser games, and the more approachable nature of the more modern point and clicks."
