= Holborn 9100 =

1981 Dutch computer

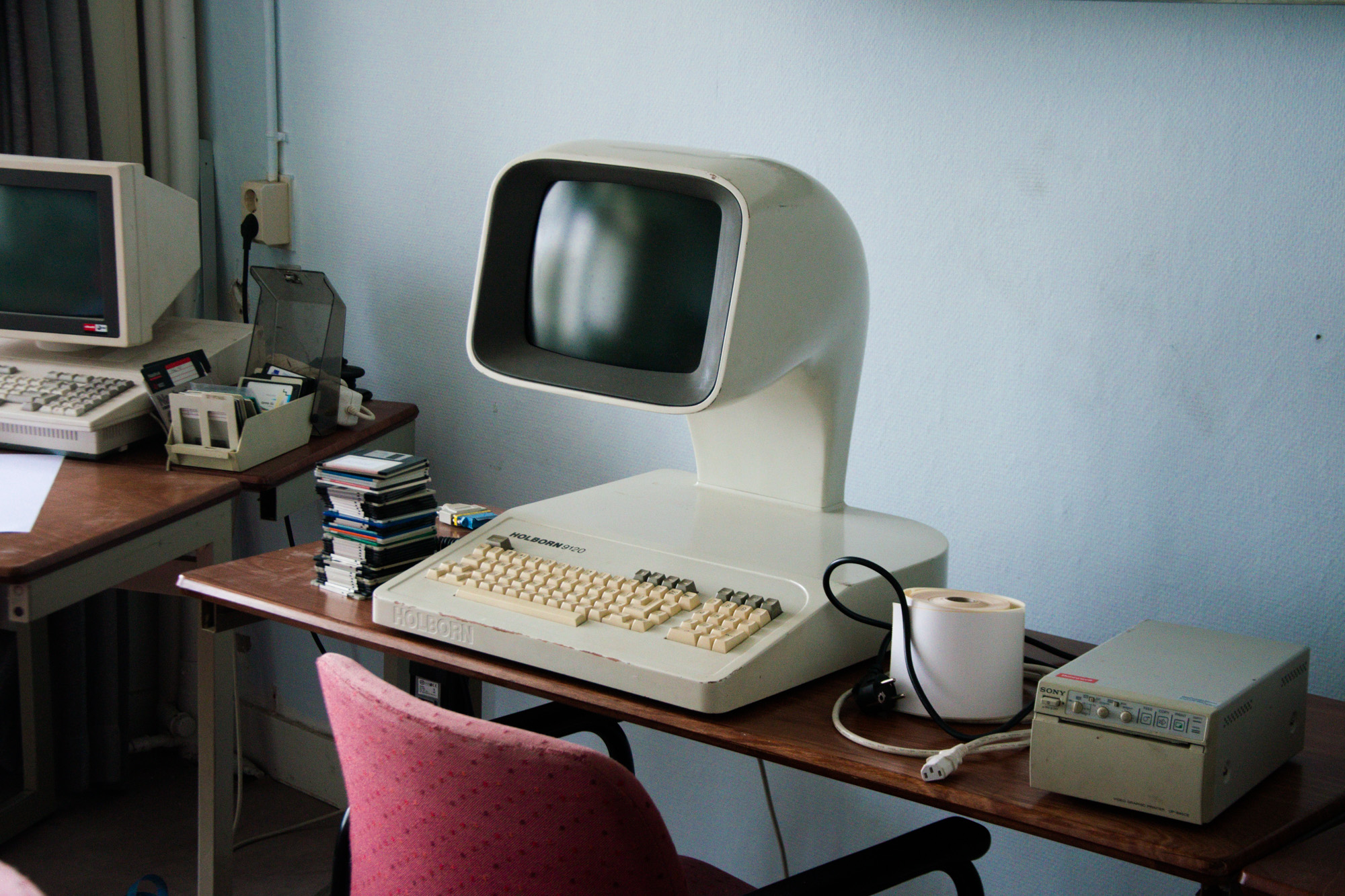
- A Holborn 9120 terminal
- Developer: Holborn
- Manufacturer: Holborn
- Type: Personal computer
- Generation: 8-bit
- Released: 1981; 45 years ago
- Lifespan: 1981–1983
- Discontinued: 1983
- Units sold: 200 approx
- Media: 8-inch floppy disk
- Operating system: CP/M, Holborn OS
- CPU: Z80 @ 4 MHz and equivalent
- Memory: 72 KB / 220 KB
- Marketing target: Business

The Holborn 9100 was a personal computer introduced in 1981 by a small Dutch company called Holborn. Only around 200 of these devices were sold, with Holborn going into bankruptcy in 1983.

== History ==
The Holborn 9100 was released in 1981 by Dutch computer manufacturer Holborn. The appearance was designed by an industrial design office named Studio Vos and developed by Hans Polak and Henny Beavers. The name comes from the phrase "born in Holland." There were two main versions, a larger one with a proprietary multi-user operating system named Holborn OS with support for a light pen, and a smaller machine with the operating system CP/M and no light pen support.

These versions were split into four different models released: the 9100, 7100, 6500, and 6100. The systems consist primarily of a combined desktop monitor, terminal, and keyboard with an external unit housing two 8 inch floppy drives and an optional hard drive. The 6500 series had a detachable keyboard. The computer was primarily marketed to small companies for administration and bookkeeping purposes. The lower-numbered models were produced after the release of the 9100. Around 200 machines were produced, with 50 of them being the larger models.

Due to the high price of the system at the time at 30,000 guilder or $10,000 USD (equivalent to $30,591 in 2023) and competition from IBM, the system was a commercial failure and caused the manufacturer to go bankrupt in 1983. The most popular version was the 6100. It is estimated that around 20 systems survive.

== Specifications ==
- OS: Holborn OS or CP/M
- CPU: Zilog Z80A at 4 MHz
- RAM: 72 KB (expandable to 220KB)
- Storage: 2.5 MB on two 8 inch floppy disks, optional 30 MB hard drive
- Monitor: 12 inch, made of green phosphors

== Holborn OS ==
Holborn OS (HOS) was a multi-user operating system developed by Holborn. It was stored entirely on ROM and used floppy disks to start applications. The application software was menu driven and could be controlled by a light pen to aid use by technically unskilled users.

== Holborn ==
Holborn Computers was founded in 1979 by Hans Polak and Dick Gerdzen. The goal of the company was to supply computers based on microprocessor technology to specific types of retailers. The company saw a market for cheaper computer systems as IBM computers were expensive at the time. Henny Beavers joined soon afterwards. The company aimed to design and manufacture the systems as quickly as possible to get them out in the market.

Once the Holborn 9100 was released in 1981, they marketed it using displays at trade shows and advertisements. Due to competition from more popular IBM computers, Holborn remained dependent on financial aid from the Overijssel development company OOM. OOM could not supply enough financial resources and Gerdzen had to leave the company, causing the company to go bankrupt on 27 April 1983. They ultimately considered the 9100 a failure.

== Reception ==
The Holborn 9100 is noted for its design, being referred to as "something out of a retro-futuristic movie" by cybernews. Inexhibit noted that "The design of the Holborn set it apart from most computers of the time," calling it futuristic and organic.

== See also ==
- Aster CT-80, another 1980s Dutch computer
