= Tamarack Microelectronics =

- Industry: Semiconductors
- Founded: 1987; 39 years ago
- Defunct: 2002
- Fate: acquired by IC Plus
- Headquarters: Hsichih Taipei, Taiwan
- Area served: Worldwide
- Products: mixed-signal integrated circuits, Ethernet

Tamarack Microelectronics was a designer and manufacturer of mixed-signal integrated circuits, primarily Ethernet communications devices. It was founded in 1987 in Hsichih, Taipei. In August 2002 it merged with IC Plus.

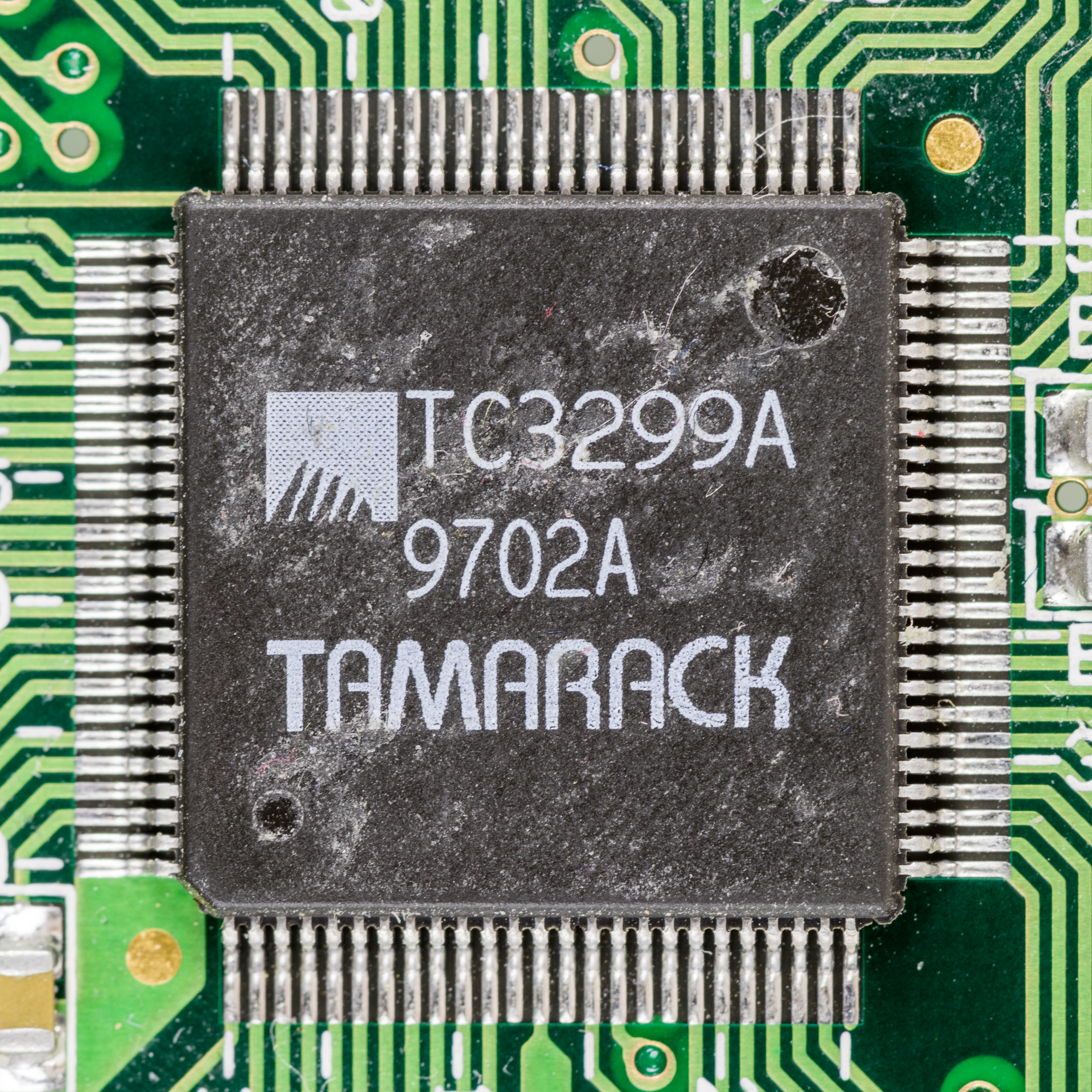
Tamarack TC3299A

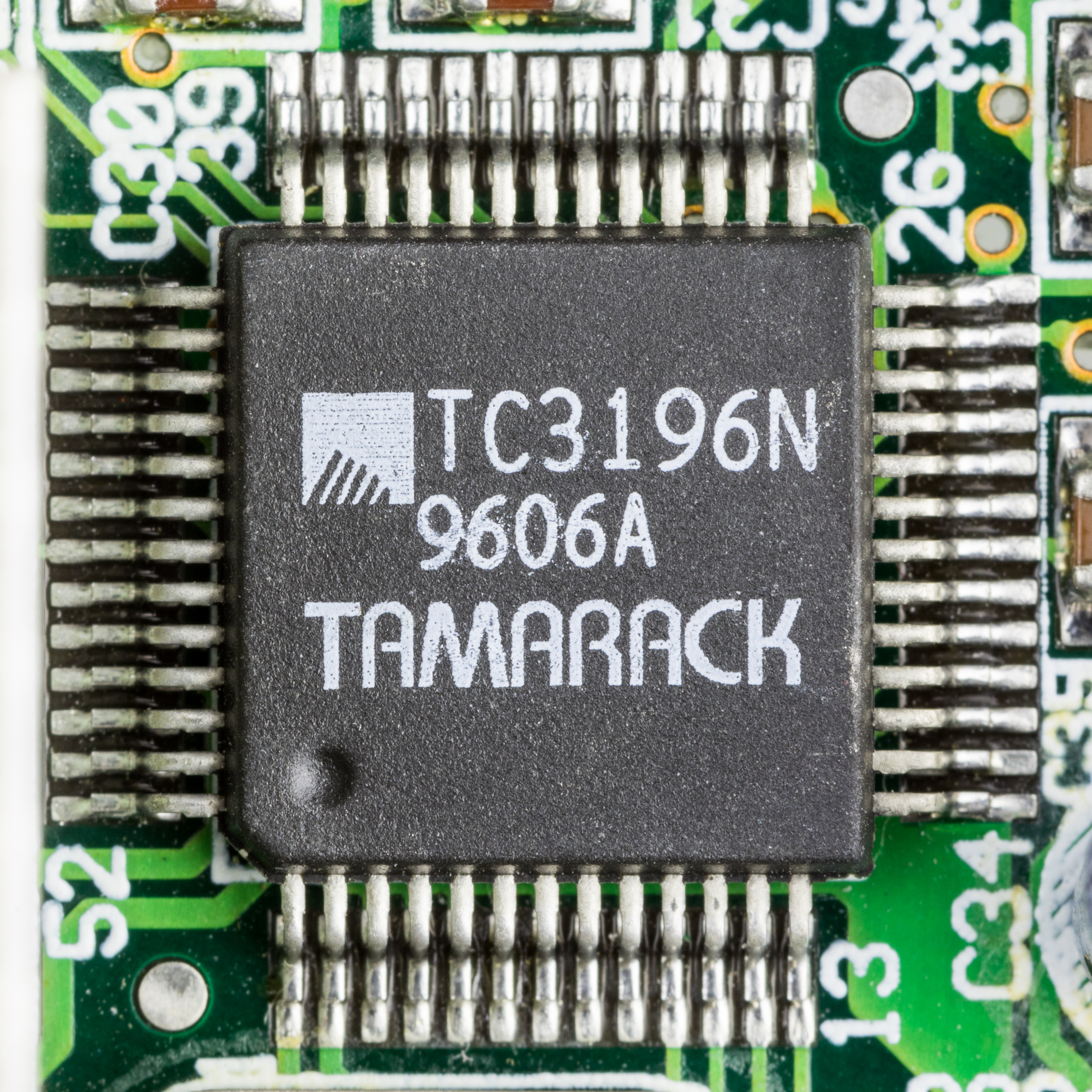
Tamarack TC3196N

== Products ==
Device	Description
TC3001	10Mbit/s Ethernet Silicon 10BaseT Filter & Buffer
TD3088A3	Monochrome Display Adapter controller
TC3092HN + TC3196N	10Mbit/s Ethernet BNC + TP Transceiver Set
TC3097-8	8 ports 10Mbit/s Ethernet Repeater Controller
TC3097F-5	5 ports 10Mbit/s Ethernet Repeater Controller + On-Chip-Filters
TC3097F-8	8 ports 10Mbit/s Ethernet Repeater Controller + On-Chip-Filters
TC3299A	5 Volt 10Mbit/s Ethernet PCMCIA Controller
TC3299CE	3.3 Volt 10Mbit/s Ethernet PCMCIA Controller
TC3399A	5 Volt 10Mbit/s Ethernet PCMCIA Controller + UART Interface
TC6216M	16 ports 10/100Mbit/s QoS Ethernet Switch Controller w/ embedded memory
TC6208	8 ports 10/100Mbit/s QoS Ethernet Switch Controller
TC6102	2 ports 10/100Mbit/s Ethernet Switch Controller
TC9021	32/64bit PCI 10/100/1000Mbit/s Ethernet MAC Controller

== Patents ==
Patent Number	Description	Date Issued
5892701	Silicon filtering buffer apparatus and the method of operation thereof	April 6, 1999
5572511	Auto-adjustment circuit for collision detection of Ethernet	November 5, 1996
5425054	Surrounding circuit for the Ethernet coaxial local area network transceiver	June 13, 1995
5042051	Apparatus for transmitting and receiving Manchester coded digital data for IEEE 802.3 Ethernet/Cheapernet type local area network	August 20, 1991
