= Sierra's 3-D Helicopter Simulator =

1987 video game

- Publisher: Sierra On-Line
- Platform: MS-DOS
- Release: 1987
- Genre: Combat flight simulation

Sierra's 3-D Helicopter Simulator (shown on the box as 3D without the hypen) is a combat flight simulation game developed and published by Sierra On-Line. It was released for MS-DOS in 1987.

== Gameplay ==
Sierra's 3-D Helicopter Simulator is a combat helicopter simulation in which head-to-head play is available via modem.

== Reception ==
M. Evan Brooks reviewed the game for Computer Gaming World, and stated that "While 3-D Helicopter Simulator offers an interesting flight experience and a challenging two player modem game, the game is somewhat predictable as a solitaire combat simulator."
