= Hercules InColor Card =

- Release date: April 1987; 39 years ago
- Manufactured by: Hercules Computer Technology, Inc.

History
- Predecessor: Hercules Graphics Card

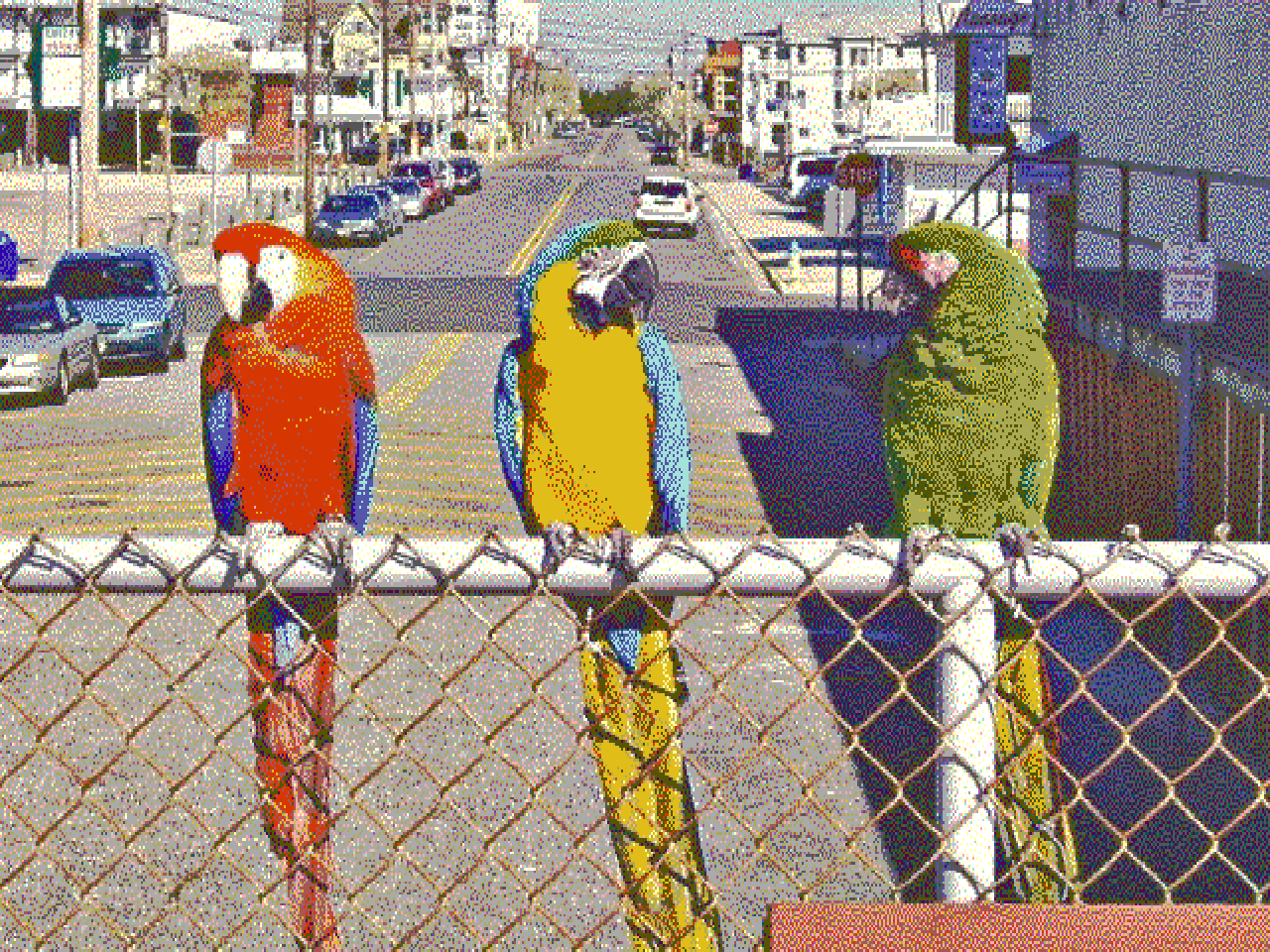
Simulated Hercules InColor Card 640 x 350 x 16 graphics resolution and color abilities, corrected for aspect ratio

The Hercules InColor Card (GB222) is an IBM PC compatible 8-bit ISA graphics controller card released in April 1987 by Hercules Computer Technology, Inc. It supported a fixed hardware palette of 64 colours, with the ability to display 720 × 350 with 16 colours on an EGA monitor and software redefinable fonts.

After the success of the monochrome Hercules Graphics Card (HGC) and Hercules Graphics Card Plus (HGC+) which gained wide developer support, the market was changing with the release of new colour cards which were becoming increasingly affordable. So Hercules released the InColor to compete primarily with IBM's new high-end VGA card, and also with many existing EGA compatible cards on the market.

The card came with drivers for popular programs like Lotus 1-2-3, AutoCAD, WordPerfect 5.0 or Microsoft Windows. Some compatible games with the card included Karateka, Microsoft Flight Simulator 3.0 and 4, 3-D Helicopter Simulator, RAPCON: Military Air Traffic Control Simulator and Eco Adventures in the Oceans.

The InColor did not bring the success that Hercules had hoped for, and revenue slowly declined until Hercules was eventually acquired by Guillemot Corporation in October 1999 for $1.5m USD.

== See also ==
- Hercules Graphics Card
- Hercules Graphics Card Plus
- Hercules Network Card Plus
