= Pixel format =

Output format of data from digital camera

A pixel format refers to the format in which the image data output by a digital camera is represented. In comparison to the raw pixel information captured by the image sensor, the output pixels could be formatted differently based on the active pixel format. For several digital cameras, this format is a user-configurable feature; the available pixel formats on a particular camera depend on the type and model of the camera.

The image sensors in digital cameras contain pixels, each of which measures the amount of incoming light. The pixel format of the image sensor dictates or determines the color depth (often referred to as bit depth), color filter array filtering patterns that are used by the sensor, and the method by which pixel information is stored (packed pixel and planar pixel). The pixel format for the sensor is typically user-configurable.

== Common pixel formats ==
The European Machine Vision Association provides recommendations for the creation of pixel format labels, and these are followed by some manufacturers.

=== Monochromatic formats ===
Monochromatic formats are often labeled by sensor manufacturers with the following indicators:

- An indication that the pixel is measuring the entire spectrum it is sensitive to, for example with the word "mono"
- A number to indicate the color depth
- An indication of the method by which the data is stored, packed pixel or planar pixel

=== Color formats ===
Sensors that collect color information (as opposed to broadband monochromatic information) do so in a myriad of ways. Manufacturers typically label these formats with the following indicators:

- An indication of how the color information is collected throughout the sensor
- A number to indicate the color depth (e.g., 8, 10, or 12 bits per pixel)
- An indication of the method by which the data is stored, such as packed pixel or planar pixel

== See also ==
- Color image pipeline
- Color filter array
- Bayer filter
- RGBE filter
- Chroma subsampling
- Image sensor format
- Raw image format
