= List of computer display standards =

Specification of display attributes

Computer display standards are a combination of aspect ratio, display size, display resolution, color depth, and refresh rate. They are associated with specific expansion cards, video connectors, and monitors.

== History ==
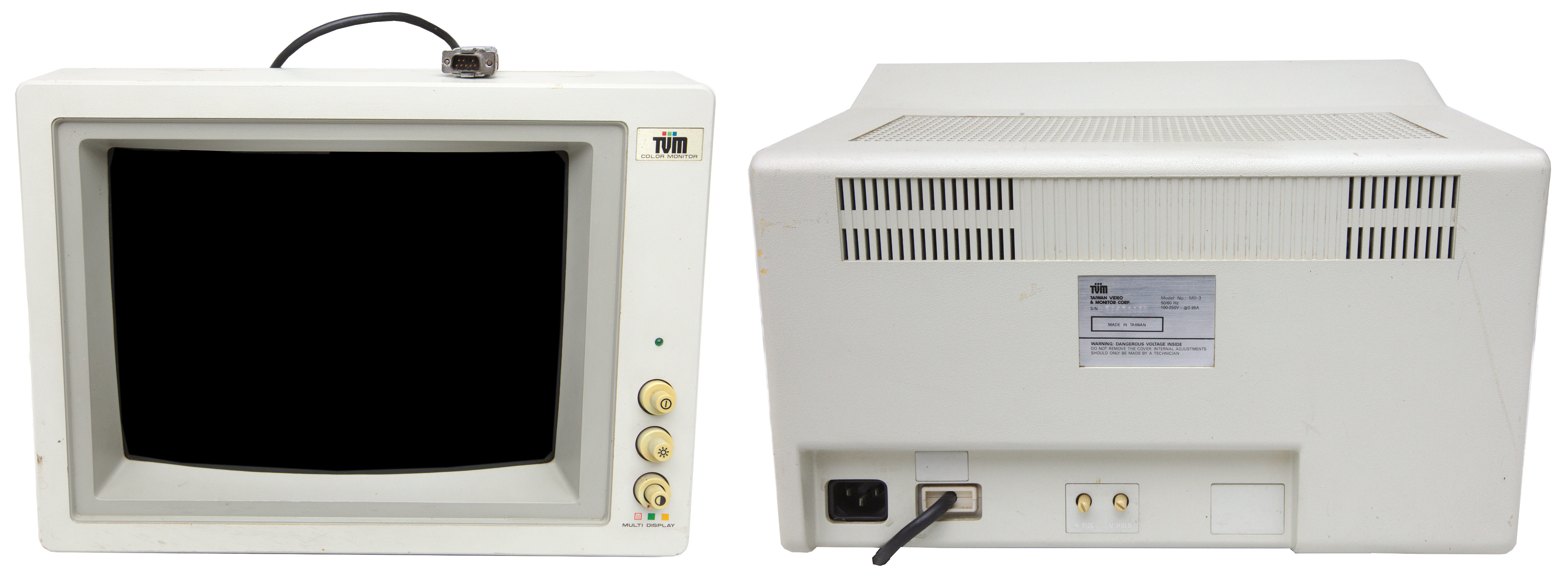
Front and rear views of the TVM MD-3 cathode-ray tube monitor (Enhanced Graphics Adapter era). Note the DE-9 connector, cryptic mode switch, contrast and brightness controls at front, and the V-Size and V-Hold knobs at rear, which allow the control of the scaling and signal to CRT refresh rate synchronization respectively.

Various computer display standards or display modes have been used in the history of the personal computer. They are often a combination of aspect ratio (specified as width-to-height ratio), display resolution (specified as the width and height in pixels), color depth (measured in bits per pixel), and refresh rate (expressed in hertz). Associated with the screen resolution and refresh rate is a display adapter. Earlier display adapters were simple frame-buffers, but later display standards also specified a more extensive set of display functions and software controlled interface.

Beyond display modes, the VESA industry organization has defined several standards related to power management and device identification, while ergonomics standards are set by the TCO.

== Standards ==
A number of common resolutions have been used with computers descended from the original IBM PC. Some of these are now supported by other families of personal computers. These are de facto standards, usually originated by one manufacturer and reverse-engineered by others, though the VESA group has co-ordinated the efforts of several leading video display adapter manufacturers. Video standards associated with IBM-PC-descended personal computers are shown in the diagram and table below, alongside those of early Macintosh and other makes for comparison. (From the early 1990s onwards, most manufacturers moved over to PC display standards thanks to widely available and affordable hardware).

Comparison of video resolutions. The curved lines show the thresholds for resolutions with at least 1, 2, 3, 4 or 5 million pixels.

Table of computer display standards (by height and width)
Video standard	Full name	Description	Display resolution	(Maximum) Width	(Maximum) Height	(Maximum) Area	Storage aspect ratio (effectively: Display aspect ratio)	Color depth (2^bpp colors)
			(pixels)	(px)	(px)	(px)		
QQVGA	Quarter Quarter Video Graphics Array	Used on some portable devices, and is a common alternative resolution to QCIF for webcams and other online video streams in low-bandwidth situations, and on video modes of early and later low-end digital cameras.	160 × 120 (19k)	160	120	19,200	4:3	
UNNAMED	UNNAMED	A common size for LCDs manufactured for small consumer electronics, basic mobile phones and feature phones, typically in a 1.7" to 1.9" diagonal size. This LCD is often used in portrait (128 × 160) orientation. The unusual 5:4 aspect ratio makes the display slightly different from QQVGA dimensions.	160 × 128 (20k)	160	128	20,480	5:4	
UNNAMED	UNNAMED	A shared size for older portable video game systems. The nearly-square (but landscape) aspect ratio and coarse pixel resolution gave these games a characteristic visual style. Colour depth ranged from 4 colours (2 bpp) with the original Game Boy, through 16–32 colours (4–5 bpp) with the Game Gear, to a maximum of 56 colours (equivalent of 6 bpp) from a wider palette with the Game Boy Color. Also appears as a YouTube resolution option ("144p").	160 × 144 (23k)	160	144	23,040	10:9 (effectively 4:3 (non-square pixels) on Game Gear)	2 bpp (6 bpp effective)
HQVGA	Half Quarter Video Graphics Array	Used with some smaller, cheaper portable devices, including the Nintendo Game Boy Advance.	240 × 160 (38k)	240	160	38,400	3:2	
ST Low/Med Resolution	Atari ST (etc.) Colour, Broadcast-standard	Atari ST line. Colour modes using NTSC or PAL-compliant televisions, and monochrome, composite video or RGB-component monitors.	640 × 200, 320 × 200	640	200	128,000	4:3 (or 16:5 and 16:10 with square pixels)	2–4 bpp for ST, 2–15 bpp on the Falcon.
CGA	Color Graphics Adapter	Introduced in 1981 by IBM, as the first colour display standard for the IBM PC. The standard CGA graphics cards were equipped with 16 kB video RAM.	640 × 200 (128k); 320 × 200 (64k); 160 × 200 (32k)	640	200	128,000	16:5; 16:10/8:5; 4:5 (effectively 4:3 on CRTs; various aspects on LCDs)	1 bpp 2 bpp 4 bpp
QVGA	Quarter Video Graphics Array	Half the resolution in each dimension as standard VGA. First appeared as a VESA mode (134h=256 color, 135h=Hi-Color) that primarily allowed 80 × 30 character text with graphics, and should not be confused with CGA (320 × 200); QVGA is normally used when describing screens on portable devices (PDAs, pocket media players, feature phones, smartphones, etc.). No set colour depth or refresh rate is associated with this standard or those that follow, as it is dependent both on the manufacturing quality of the screen and the capabilities of the attached display driver hardware, and almost always incorporates an LCD panel with no visible line-scanning. However, it would typically be in the 8-to-12 bpp (256–4096 colours) through 18 bpp (262,144 colours) range.	320 × 240 (77k)	320	240	76,800	4:3	
TV Computer	Non-interlaced TV-as-monitor	Various Apple, Atari, Commodore, Sinclair, Acorn, Tandy and other home and small-office computers introduced from 1977 through to the mid-1980s. They used televisions for display output and had a typical usable screen resolution from 102–320 pixels wide and usually 192–256 lines high, in non-interlaced (NI) mode for a more stable image (displaying a full image on each 1/50th/1/60th-second field, instead of splitting it across each frame). The limited resolution led to displays with a characteristic wide overscan border around the active area. Some more powerful machines were able to display higher horizontal resolutions—either in text-mode alone or in low-colour bitmap graphics, and typically by halving the width of each pixel, rather than physically expanding the display area—but were still confined in the vertical dimension by the relatively slow horizontal scanning rate of a domestic TV set. These same standards—albeit with progressively greater colour depth and upstream graphical processing ability—would see extended use and popularity in TV-connected game consoles right through to the end of the 20th century.	640 × 256 NI (high-end), 320 × 200 NI (typical), 140 × 192 NI (low-end)	640	256	163,840	4:3 (non-square pixels)	1–4 bpp typical, 2 or 3 bpp common.
WQVGA	Wide Quarter Video Graphics Array	Effectively 1/16 the total resolution (1/4 in each dimension) of "Full HD", but with the height aligned to an 8-pixel "macroblock" boundary. Common in small-screen video applications, including portable DVD players and the Sony PSP.	480 × 272 (131k)	480	272	130,560	c. 1% narrower than 16:9 (30:17 exact)	
Mac Mono 9"	Original Apple Macintosh display	The single fixed-screen mode used in first-generation (128k and 512k) Apple Mac computers, launched in 1984, with a monochrome 9" CRT integrated into the body of the computer. Used to display one of the first mass-market full-time GUIs, and one of the earliest non-interlaced default displays with more than 256 lines of vertical resolution. (Early models used a 384 × 256 screen; both standards are cut down from the 720 × 364 of the preceding Lisa model)	512 × 342 (175k)	512	342	175,104	Very nearly 3:2 (to within 0.2%); 256:171 exact. Displayed with square pixels on a moderately wide-screen monitor (equivalent to 16:10.67 in modern terms).	1 bpp
Hercules		A monochrome display capable of sharp text and graphics for its time. Very popular with the Lotus 1-2-3 spreadsheet application, which was one of PC's first killer apps. Introduced in 1982.	720 × 348 (251k)	720	348	250,560	60:29 (effectively 4:3)	1 bpp
EGA	Enhanced Graphics Adapter	Introduced in 1984 by IBM. A resolution of 640 × 350 pixels of 16 different colours in 4 bits per pixel (bpp), selectable from a 64-colour palette in 2 bits per each of red-green-blue (RGB) unit. Other commonly used modes were the existing CGA 320 × 200 and 640 × 200 resolutions in 4 bpp, with a fixed palette corresponding to the 16 colours available in CGA text mode, allowing an EGA card to be used in full colour with an unmodified CGA monitor by setting the correct DIP switch options; plus full EGA resolution (and CGA hi-res) in monochrome, if installed memory was insufficient for full colour at above 320 × 200.	640 × 350 (224k), 640 × 200 (128k), 320 × 200 (64k)	640	350	224,000	64:35, 16:5 and 16:10/8:5 (all effectively 4:3)	4 bpp
MDA	Monochrome Display Adapter	The original standard on IBM PCs and IBM PC XTs with 4 kB video RAM. Introduced in 1981 by IBM. Supports text mode only.	720 × 350 (252k)	720	350	252,000	72:35 (effectively 4:3 (non-square pixels) on CRTs but could be a variety of aspects on LCDs)	1 bpp
Orchid Graphics Adapter		A monochrome display that expanded Monochrome Display Adapter's capabilities with graphics. Introduced in 1982.	720 × 350	720	350	252,000	72:35 (effectively 4:3 (non-square pixels) on CRTs but could be a variety of aspects on LCDs)	1 bpp
ST High Resolution	Atari ST (etc.) Monochrome, proprietary standard	Atari ST line. High resolution monochrome mode using a custom non-interlaced monitor with the slightly lower vertical resolution (in order to be an integer multiple of low and medium resolution and thus utilize the same amount of RAM for the framebuffer) allowing a "flicker free" 71.25 Hz refresh rate, higher even than the highest refresh rate provided by VGA. All machines in the ST series could also use colour or monochrome VGA monitors with a proper cable or physical adapter, and all but the TT could display 640 × 400 at 71.25 Hz on VGA monitors.	640 × 400	640	400	256,000	4:3 (or 16:10 with square pixels)	1 bpp for ST, on the Falcon: 1-8 bpp grayscale on the ST monochrome monitor, and 8 bpp colour on VGA/multisync monitors.
PowerBook internal panel	PowerBook, early generations	The first PowerBook, released in 1991, replaced the original Mac Portable (basically an original Mac with an LCD, keyboard and trackball in a lunchbox-style shell), and introduced a new 640 × 400 greyscale screen. This was joined in 1993 with the PowerBook 165c, which kept the same resolution but added colour capability similar to that of Mac II (256 colours from a palette of 16.7 million).	640 × 400 (256k)	640	400	256,000	16:10/8:5 (square pixels)	8 bpp
Professional Graphics Controller		With on-board 2D and 3D acceleration introduced in 1984 for the 8-bit PC-bus, intended for CAD applications, a triple-board display adapter with built-in processor, and displaying high-resolution, full-colour graphics at a 60 Hz frame rate.	640 × 480 (307k)	640	480	307,200	4:3	8 bpp
MCGA	Multi-Color Graphics Array	Introduced by IBM on ISA-based PS/2 models in 1987, with reduced cost compared to VGA. MCGA had a 320 × 200 256-colour (from a 262,144 colour palette) mode, and a 640 × 480 mode only in monochrome due to 64k video memory, compared to the 256k memory of VGA.	640 × 480 (307k), 320 × 200 (64k)	640	480	307,200	4:3 (square pixels); 16:10 (effectively 4:3)	8 bpp 1 bpp
VGA	Video Graphics Array	Introduced on MCA-based PS/2 models in 1987, it replaced the digital TTL signaling of EGA and earlier standards with analog RGBHV signaling, using the synonymous VGA connector. As with EGA, the VGA standard actually encompasses a set of different resolutions; 640 × 480 is sometimes referred to as "VGA resolution" today, however as per the original standard this mode actually only supports 16 colours (4 bpp) at 60 Hz. Other common display modes also defined as VGA include 320 × 200 at 256 colours (8 bpp) (standard VGA resolution for DOS games that stems from halving the pixel rate of 640 × 400, but doubling color depth) and a text mode with 720 × 400 pixels; these modes run at 70 Hz and use non-square pixels, so 4:3 aspect correction is required for correct display. Furthermore, VGA displays and adapters are generally capable of Mode X graphics, an undocumented mode to allow increased non-standard resolutions, most commonly 320 × 240 (with 8 bpp and square pixels) at 60 Hz. VGA, like the majority of the following standards, was capable of displaying most standard modes featured by IBM-compatible PCs—CGA, EGA, MDA and MCGA—but typically not Hercules or PGA/PGC.	640 × 480 (307k) (hi-res graphics and LCD text); 720 × 400 (CRT text; 288k equivalent); 320 × 200 (64k), 320 × 240 (75k)	640	480	307,200	4:3; 9:5 (non-square PAR 4:3); 16:10/8:5 (non-square PAR 4:3)	4 bpp 4 bpp 8 bpp
Video monitor I/NI	Full-broadcast resolution video monitor or television	Amiga, Acorn Archimedes, Atari Falcon, and others. They used NTSC or PAL-compliant televisions and monochrome, composite video or RGB-component monitors. The interlaced (i or I) mode produced visible flickering of finer details, eventually fixable by use of scan doubler devices and VGA monitors.	720 × 480i/576i maximum. Typically 640 × 400i/512i or 640 × 200/256 NI, and 320 × 200/256 NI for games.	720	576	414,720	4:3 (non-square pixels)	Up to 6 bpp for Amiga (8 bpp with later models), typically 2–4 bpp for most hi-res applications (saving memory and processing time), 4–5 bpp for games and "fake" 12/18 bpp for static images (HAM mode). Up to 15 bpp for Archimedes and Falcon (12 bpp for TT), but typically 4 bpp in use.
SVGA	Super Video Graphics Array	An extension to VGA defined by VESA for IBM PC-compatible computers in 1989 meant to take advantage of video cards that exceeded the minimum 256 kB defined in the VGA standard. For instance, one of the early supported modes was 800 × 600 in 16 colours at a slightly lower 56 Hz refresh rate, leading to 800 × 600 sometimes being referred to as "SVGA resolution" today. Over the course of the early-to-mid-1990s, "SVGA" became a quasi-standard term in PC games, typically referring to a 640 × 480 resolution using 256 colours (8 bpp) at 60 Hz refresh rate. Many other higher and lower modes were standardized in the VESA BIOS Extensions, leading to the establishment of "SVGA" and "VESA" as catch-all terms encompassing output modes that surpassed the original VGA specifications.	800 × 600 (480k); 640 × 480 (307k)	800	600	480,000	4:3	4 bpp 8 bpp
Mac Colour	Apple Mac II and later models	The second-generation Macintosh, launched in 1987, came with colour (and greyscale) capability as standard, at two levels, depending on monitor size—512 × 384 (1/4 of the later XGA standard) on a 12" (4:3) colour or greyscale (monochrome) monitor; 640 × 480 with a larger (13" or 14") high-resolution monitor (superficially similar to VGA, but at a higher 67 Hz refresh rate)—with 8-bit colour/256 grey shades at the lower resolution, and either 4-bit or 8-bit colour (16/256 grey) in high resolution depending on installed memory (256 or 512 kB), all out of a full 24-bit master palette. The result was equivalent to VGA or even PGC—but with a wide palette—at a point simultaneous with the IBM launch of VGA. Later, larger monitors (15" and 16") allowed use of an SVGA-like binary-half-megapixel 832 × 624 resolution (at 75 Hz) that was eventually used as the default setting for the original, late-1990s iMac. Even larger 17" and 19" monitors could attain higher resolutions still, when connected to a suitably capable computer, but apart from the 1152 × 870 XGA+ mode discussed further below, Mac resolutions beyond 832 × 624 tended to fall into line with PC standards, using what were essentially rebadged PC monitors with a different cable connection. Mac models after the II (Power Mac, Quadra, etc.) also allowed at first 16-bit High Colour (65,536, or "Thousands of" colours), and then 24-bit True Colour (16.7M, or "Millions of" colours), but much like PC standards beyond XGA, the increase in colour depth past 8 bpp was not strictly tied to changing resolution standards.	832 × 624 (519k), 640 × 480 (307k), 512 × 384 (197k)	832	624	519,168	4:3	4 bpp, 8 bpp, and later 16/24 bpp
HD	High Definition (720p)	This display aspect ratio is among the most common in recent notebook computers and desktop monitors.	1280 × 720 (921k)	1280	720	921,600	16:9	24 bpp
8514		Precursor to XGA and released shortly after VGA in 1987. 8514/A cards displayed interlaced video at 43.5 Hz in a 1024 × 768 resolution, and at 640 × 480, 60 Hz non-interlaced, both with up to 256 colours. The high-resolution mode introduced by 8514/A became a de facto general standard in a succession of computing and digital-media fields for more than two decades, arguably more so than SVGA, with successive IBM and clone video cards and CRT monitors (a multisync monitor's grade being broadly determinable by whether it could display 1024 × 768 at all, or show it interlaced, non-interlaced, or "flicker-free"), LCD panels (the standard resolution for 14" and 15" 4:3 desktop monitors, and a whole generation of 11–15" laptops), early plasma and HD ready LCD televisions (albeit at a stretched 16:9 aspect ratio, showing down-scaled material), professional video projectors, and most recently, tablet computers.	1024 × 768 (786k), 640 × 480 (307k)	1024	768	786,432	4:3	8 bpp
XGA	Extended Graphics Array	An IBM display standard introduced in 1990. XGA built on 8514/A's existing 1024 × 768 mode and added support for "high colour" (65,536 colours, 16 bpp) at 640 × 480. The second revision ("XGA-2") was a more thorough upgrade, offering higher refresh rates (75 Hz and up, non-interlaced, up to at least 1024 × 768), improved performance, and a fully programmable display engine capable of almost any resolution within its physical limits. For example, 1280 × 1024 (5:4) or 1360 × 1024 (≈4:3) in 16 colours at 60 Hz, 1056 × 400 [14h] Text Mode (132 × 50 characters); 800 × 600 in 256 or 64k colours; and even as high as 1600 × 1200 (at a reduced 50 Hz scan rate) with a high-quality multisync monitor (or an otherwise non-standard 960 × 720 at 60 Hz on a lower-end one capable of high refresh rates at 800 × 600, but only interlaced mode at 1024 × 768). However, the extended modes required custom drivers, and so only the basic options (1024×768×8 I, 640×480×16 NI, high-res text) were commonly used outside Windows and other hardware-abstracting graphical environments.	1024 × 768 (786k); 640 × 480 (307k), 1056 × 400 (text, 422k equivalent)	1024	768	786,432	4:3; 4:3, 66:25 (effectively 4:3)	8 bpp 16 bpp
WXGA	Widescreen Extended Graphics Array	A wide version of the XGA format. This display aspect ratio was common in widescreen notebook computers until c. 2010.	1366 × 768 (1,049k), 1360 × 768 (1,044k), 1280 × 800 (1,024k)	1366	768	1,049,088	≈16:9 (1366 × 768 and 1360 × 768), 16:10 (1280 × 800)	24 bpp
XGA+	Extended Graphics Array Plus	Although not an official name, this term is now used to refer to 1152 × 864, which is the largest 4:3 array yielding less than a binary megapixel (2^20, 1048576 pixels, 1048 decimal kilopixels), thus allowing the greatest "normal" resolution at common colour depths with a standard amount of video memory (128 kB, 512 kB, 1 MB, 2 MB, etc.). Variants of this were used by NeXT (at 1120 × 832), Apple (at 1152 × 870), and Sun Microsystems (at 1152 × 900) for 17" to 21" CRT displays..	1152 × 864 (995k); 1120 × 832 (932k); 1152 × 870 (1,002k); 1152 × 900 (1,037k)	1152	864	995,328	4:3	8 bpp 16 bpp
WXGA+ (WSXGA)	Widescreen Extended Graphics Array PLUS	An enhanced version of the WXGA format. This display aspect ratio was common in widescreen notebook computers, and many 19" widescreen LCD monitors until c. 2010.	1440 × 900 (1,296k)	1440	900	1,296,000	16:10	24 bpp
HD+	High Definition Plus (900p)		1600 × 900 (1,440k)	1600	900	1,440,000	16:9	24 bpp
TT High Resolution	Atari TT (etc.) Monochrome, proprietary standard	Atari TT line. High resolution monochrome mode using a custom non-interlaced ECL monitor, allowing a higher, "flicker free" 70 Hz refresh rate.	1280 × 960 (1229k)	1280	960	1,228,800	4:3	1 bpp for TT.
SXGA	Super Extended Graphics Array	A widely used de facto standard, introduced with XGA-2 and other early "multiscan" graphics cards and monitors, with an unusual aspect ratio of 5:4 (1.25:1) instead of the more common 4:3 (1.3̅:1), meaning that even 4:3 pictures and video will appear letterboxed on the narrower 5:4 screens. This is generally the native resolution—with, therefore, square pixels—of standard 17" and 19" LCD monitors. It was often a recommended resolution for 17" and 19" CRTs also, though as they were usually produced in a 4:3 aspect ratio, it either gave non-square pixels or required adjustment to show small vertical borders at each side of the image. Allows 24-bit colour in 4 MB of graphics memory, or 4-bit colour in 640 kB.: Some manufacturers, noting that the de facto industry standard was VGA (Video Graphics Array), termed this the Extended Video Graphics Array, or XVGA.	1280 × 1024 (1,310k)	1280	1024	1,310,720	5:4	24 bpp
SXGA+	Super Extended Graphics Array PLUS	Used on 14" and 15" notebook LCD screens and a few smaller screens, until the eventual market-wide phasing-out of 4:3 aspect displays.	1400 × 1050 (1,470k)	1400	1050	1,470,000	4:3	24 bpp
WSXGA+	Widescreen Super Extended Graphics Array Plus	A wide version of the SXGA+ format, the native resolution for many 22" widescreen LCD monitors, also used in larger, wide-screen notebook computers until c. 2010.	1680 × 1050 (1,764k)	1680	1050	1,764,000	16:10	24 bpp
FHD	Full High Definition (1080p)	This display aspect ratio is the native resolution for many 24" widescreen LCD monitors, and is expected to also become a standard resolution for smaller-to-medium-sized wide-aspect tablet computers in the near future (as of 2012).	1920 × 1080 (2,073k)	1920	1080	2,073,600	16:9	24 bpp
DCI 2K	Digital Cinema Initiatives 2K	Baseline standard for digital cinema capture, post production and presentation.	2048 × 1080 (2,212k)	2048	1080	2,211,840	≈19:10,≈17:9 (256:135 or 1.89̅6̅2̅:1 exact)	48 bpp (at 24 frame/s)
UNNAMED	UNNAMED	Sometimes casually referred to as "1080p ultrawide". Referred to occasionally as "UW-UXGA".	2560 × 1080 (2,765k)	2560	1080	2,764,800	≈21:9 (64:27, or 2.3̅7̅0̅:1, or 21.3̅:9 exact)	24 bpp
QWXGA	Quad Wide Extended Graphics Array	Samsung has a QWXGA resolution 23" LCD monitor, the 2342BWX.	2048 × 1152 (2,359k)	2048	1152	2,359,296	16:9	
UXGA	Ultra Extended Graphics Array	A de facto high-resolution standard. This is the native resolution for many 20" LCD monitors, and was a recommended mode for some high-end 21" CRTs.	1600 × 1200 (1,920k)	1600	1200	1,920,000	4:3	24 bpp
WUXGA	Widescreen Ultra Extended Graphics Array	A wide version of the UXGA format. This display aspect ratio was popular on high-end 15" and 17" widescreen notebook computers, as well as on many 23–27" widescreen LCD monitors, until c. 2010. It is also a popular resolution for home cinema projectors, besides 1080p, in order to show non-widescreen material slightly taller than widescreen (and therefore also slightly wider than it might otherwise be), and is the highest resolution supported by single-link DVI at standard colour depth and scan rate (i.e., no less than 24 bpp and 60 Hz non-interlaced)	1920 × 1200 (2,304k)	1920	1200	2,304,000	16:10	24 bpp
UNNAMED	UNNAMED	Used on Microsoft Surface 3.	1920 × 1280 (2,458k)	1920	1280	2,457,600	3:2	24 bpp
UNNAMED	UNNAMED	4:3 superset of 1080p, common on high-resolution CRTs.	1920 × 1440 (2,765k)	1920	1440	2,764,800	4:3	24 bpp
UNNAMED	UNNAMED	Used on Microsoft Surface Pro 3.	2160 × 1440 (3,110k)	2160	1440	3,110,400	3:2	24 bpp
QHD	Quad High Definition	The native resolution for many higher end 27" widescreen IPS panels and smartphones (from the mid-2010s onward); often referred to as "WQHD"	2560 × 1440 (3,686k)	2560	1440	3,686,400	16:9	24 bpp
UNNAMED	UNNAMED	Used on LG G6, LG V30 and Pixel 2 XL smartphones.	2880 × 1440 (4,147k)	2880	1440	4,147,200	18:9/2:1	24 bpp
UNNAMED	UNNAMED	Used on Samsung Galaxy S8, Galaxy Note 8, and Galaxy S9 smartphones.	2960 × 1440 (4,262k)	2960	1440	4,262,400	18.5:9/37:18	24 bpp
UWQHD	Ultra-Wide Quad HD	Sometimes casually referred to as "1440p ultrawide".	3440 × 1440 (4,954k)	3440	1440	4,953,600	≈21:9 (43:18, or 2.38̅:1, or 21.5:9 exact)	24 bpp
QXGA	Quad Extended Graphics Array	This is the highest resolution that generally can be displayed on analog computer monitors (most CRTs), and the highest resolution that most analogue video cards and other display transmission hardware (cables, switch boxes, signal boosters) are rated for (at 60 Hz refresh). 24-bit colour requires 9 MB of video memory (and transmission bandwidth) for a single frame. It is also the native resolution of medium-to-large latest-generation (2012) standard-aspect tablet computers.	2048 × 1536 (3,146k)	2048	1536	3,145,728	4:3	24 bpp
WQXGA	Widescreen Quad Extended Graphics Array	A version of the XGA format, the native resolution for many 30" widescreen LCD monitors. Also, the highest resolution supported by dual-link DVI at a standard colour depth and non-interlaced refresh rate (i.e. at least 24 bpp and 60 Hz). Used on MacBook Pro with Retina display (13.3"). Requires 12 MB of memory/bandwidth for a single frame.	2560 × 1600 (4,096k)	2560	1600	4,096,000	16:10	24 bpp
UW4K	Ultra-Wide 4K	Commonly used on Ultra HD Blu-ray discs.	3840 × 1600 (6,144k)	3840	1600	6,144,000	12:5	24 bpp
QWXGA+	Quad Wide Extended Graphics Array Plus	Used on MacBook Pro with Retina display (15.4"). Double the resolution of the previous 1440 × 900 standard in each dimension.	2880 × 1800 (5,184k)	2880	1800	5,184,000	16:10	24 bpp
UNNAMED	UNNAMED	Used on Microsoft Surface Pro 4.	2736 × 1824 (4,991k)	2736	1824	4,990,464	3:2	24 bpp
UNNAMED	UNNAMED	Used on 14" Macbook Pro.	3024 × 1964 (5,939k)	3024	1964	5,939,136	≈14:9	10 bpp
UNNAMED	UNNAMED	Used on Microsoft Surface Book.	3000 × 2000 (6,000k)	3000	2000	6,000,000	3:2	24 bpp
QSXGA	Quad Super Extended Graphics Array	Double the resolution of SXGA in each dimension.	2560 × 2048 (5,243k)	2560	2048	5,242,800	5:4	24 bpp
WQSXGA	Wide Quad Super Extended Graphics Array		3200 × 2048 (6,554k)	3200	2048	6,553,600	≈16:10 (25:16 exact)	24 bpp
UHD 4K	Ultra High-Definition, or Quad Full High-Definition	Four times the resolution of 1080p. Requires a dual-link DVI, category 2 (high-speed) HDMI, DisplayPort or a single Thunderbolt link, and a reduced scan rate (up to 30 Hz); a DisplayPort 1.2 connection can support this resolution at 60 Hz, or 30 Hz in stereoscopic 3D.	3840 × 2160 (8,294k)	3840	2160	8,294,400	16:9	24 bpp
DCI 4K	Digital Cinema Initiatives 4K	The current standard (2012) in digital cinema. Double Hres and Vres of DCI 2K.	4096 × 2160 (8,847k)	4096	2160	8,847,360	≈19:10,≈17:9 (256:135 or 1.89̅6̅2̅:1 exact)	48 bpp (at 24 frame/s)
UW5K	Ultra-Wide 5K	Also referred to as WUHD in consumer displays. 21:9 aspect ratio version of UHD 4K, defined in CTA-861-G, or resulting from 3840 × 2160 with 4:3 pixel ratio in HDMI 2.0/2.1.	5120 × 2160 (11,059k)	5120	2160	11,059,200	≈21:9 (64:27, or 2.3̅7̅0̅:1, or 21.3̅:9 exact)	24 bpp
UNNAMED	UNNAMED	Used on 16" Macbook Pro.	3456 × 2234 (7,721k)	3456	2234	7,720,704	≈14:9	10 bpp
QUXGA	Quad Ultra Extended Graphics Array		3200 × 2400 (7,680k)	3200	2400	7,680,000	4:3	24 bpp
WQUXGA	Wide Quad Ultra Extended Graphics Array	The IBM T220/T221 LCD monitors supported this resolution, but they are discontinued and no longer available. Also used for Dell laptops from 2019 onwards.	3840 × 2400 (9,216k)	3840	2400	9,216,000	16:10	24 bpp
UHD 5K	5K Ultra High-Definition	Often referred to as "5K" or "UHD+". Having exactly double the dimensions of WQHD's 2560 × 1440 (3686k), used on Apple's late-2014 27" iMac Retina 5K Display	5120 × 2880 (14,745k)	5120	2880	14,745,600	16:9	24 bpp
UNNAMED	UNNAMED	Used on Microsoft Surface Studio.	4500 × 3000 (13,500k)	4500	3000	13,500,000	3:2	24 bpp
HXGA	Hex[adecatuple] Extended Graphics Array		4096 × 3072 (12,583k)	4096	3072	12,582,912	4:3	24 bpp
WHXGA	Wide Hex[adecatuple] Extended Graphics Array		5120 × 3200 (16,384k)	5120	3200	16,384,000	16:10	24 bpp
UW8K	Ultra-Wide 8K		7680 × 3200 (24,576k)	7680	3200	24,576,000	12:5	24 bpp
HSXGA	Hex[adecatuple] Super Extended Graphics Array		5120 × 4096 (20,972k)	5120	4096	20,971,520	5:4	24 bpp
WHSXGA	Wide Hex[adecatuple] Super Extended Graphics Array		6400 × 4096 (26,214k)	6400	4096	26,212,400	≈16:10 (25:16 exact)	24 bpp
UHD 8K	8K Ultra-high-definition (Super Hi-Vision)	Consumer video format defined by CTA-861-G. Provides effectively "pixel-less" imagery even on extra-large displays.	7680 × 4320 (33,177k)	7680	4320	33,177,600	16:9	30–36 bpp
UHD 10K		21:9 aspect ratio version of UHD 8K, defined in CTA-861-G (VIC 210-217), or resulting from 7680 × 4320 with 4:3 pixel ratio in HDMI 2.1.	10240 × 4320 (44,236k)	10240	4320	44,236,800	≈21:9 (64:27, or 2.3̅7̅0̅:1, or 21.3̅:9 exact)	30–36 bpp
HUXGA	Hex[adecatuple] Ultra Extended Graphics Array		6400 × 4800 (30,720k)	6400	4800	30,720,000	4:3	24 bpp
WHUXGA	Wide Hex[adecatuple] Ultra Extended Graphics Array		7680 × 4800 (36,864k)	7680	4800	36,864,000	16:10	24 bpp

== Display resolution prefixes ==
Although the common standard prefixes super and ultra do not indicate specific modifiers to base standard resolutions, several others do:

Quarter (Q or q)
A quarter of the base resolution. E.g. QVGA, a term for a 320 × 240 resolution, half the width and height of VGA, hence the quarter total resolution. The "Q" prefix usually indicates "Quad" (4 times as many, not 1/4 times as many) in higher resolutions, and sometimes "q" is used instead of "Q" to specify quarter (by analogy with SI prefixes m/M), but this usage is not consistent.
Wide (W)
The base resolution increased by increasing the width and keeping the height constant, for square or near-square pixels on a widescreen display, usually with an aspect ratio of either 16:9 (adding an extra 1/3rd width vs a standard 4:3 display) or 16:10 (adding an extra 1/5th). However, it is sometimes used to denote a resolution that would have roughly the same total pixel count as this, but in a different aspect and sharing neither the horizontal OR vertical resolution—typically for a 16:10 resolution which is narrower but taller than the 16:9 option, and therefore larger in both dimensions than the base standard (e.g., compare 1366 × 768 and 1280 × 800, both commonly labelled as WXGA, vs the base 1024 × 768 XGA).
Quad(ruple) (Q)
Four times as many pixels compared to the base resolution, i.e. twice the horizontal and vertical resolution respectively.
Hex(adecatuple) (H)
Sixteen times as many pixels compared to the base resolution, i.e. four times the horizontal and vertical resolutions respectively.
Super (S), eXtended (X), Plus (+) and/or Ultra (U)
Vaguer terms denoting successive incremental steps up the resolution ladder from some comparative, more established base, usually somewhat less severe a jump than quartering or Quadrupling—typically less than doubling, and sometimes not even as much of a change as making a "wide" version; for example SVGA (800 × 600 vs 640 × 480), SXGA (1280 × 1024 vs 1024 × 768), SXGA+ (1400 × 1050 vs 1280 × 1024) and UXGA (1600 × 1200 vs 1024 × 768 - or more fittingly, vs the 1280 × 1024 of SXGA, the conceptual "next step down" at the time of UXGA's inception, or the 1400 × 1050 of SXGA+). Given the use of "X" in "XGA", it is not often used as an additional modifier (e.g. there is no such thing as XVGA except as an alternative designation for SXGA) unless its meaning would be unambiguous.

These prefixes are also often combined, as in WQXGA or WHUXGA, with levels of stacking not hindered by the same consideration towards readability as the decline of the added "X" - especially as there is not even a defined hierarchy or value for S/X/U/+ modifiers.

== See also ==
- Display resolution; this also lists the display resolutions of standard and HD televisions, which are sometimes used as computer monitors.
- List of common display resolutions
- List of video connectors
