= Super VGA =

Graphics display resolution

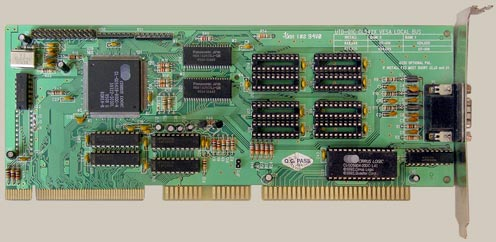
- Typical VLB SVGA card
- Release date: August 31, 1987; 38 years ago
- Architecture: Chips and Technologies 82c441, ET3000

History
- Predecessor: Video Graphics Array
- Successor: XGA

Super VGA (SVGA) or Extended VGA is a broad term that covers a wide range of computer display standards that extended IBM's VGA specification.

When used as shorthand for a resolution, as VGA and XGA often are, SVGA refers to a resolution of 800 × 600.

== History ==
Comparison between common display resolutions, including several resolutions defined for Super VGA by VESA BIOS Extensions

In the late 1980s, after the release of IBM's VGA, third-party manufacturers began making graphics cards based on its specifications with extended capabilities. As these cards grew in popularity, they began to be referred to as "Super VGA".

This term was not an official standard, but a shorthand for enhanced VGA cards which had become common by 1988. The first cards that explicitly used the term were Genoa Systems's SuperVGA and SuperVGA HiRes in 1987.

In November 1988, NEC Home Electronics announced its creation of the Video Electronics Standards Association (VESA) to develop and promote a Super VGA computer display standard as a successor to IBM's proprietary VGA display standard. Super VGA enabled graphics display resolutions up to 800×600 pixels, compared to VGA's maximum resolution of 640×480 pixels—a 56% increase.

Super VGA cards broke compatibility with the IBM VGA standard, requiring software developers to provide specific display drivers and implementations for each card their software could operate on. Initially, the heavy restrictions this placed on software developers slowed the uptake of Super VGA cards, which motivated VESA to produce a unifying standard, the VESA BIOS Extensions (VBE), first introduced in 1989, to provide a common software interface to all cards implementing the VBE specification.

Eventually, Super VGA graphics adapters supported innumerable modes.

== Specifications ==
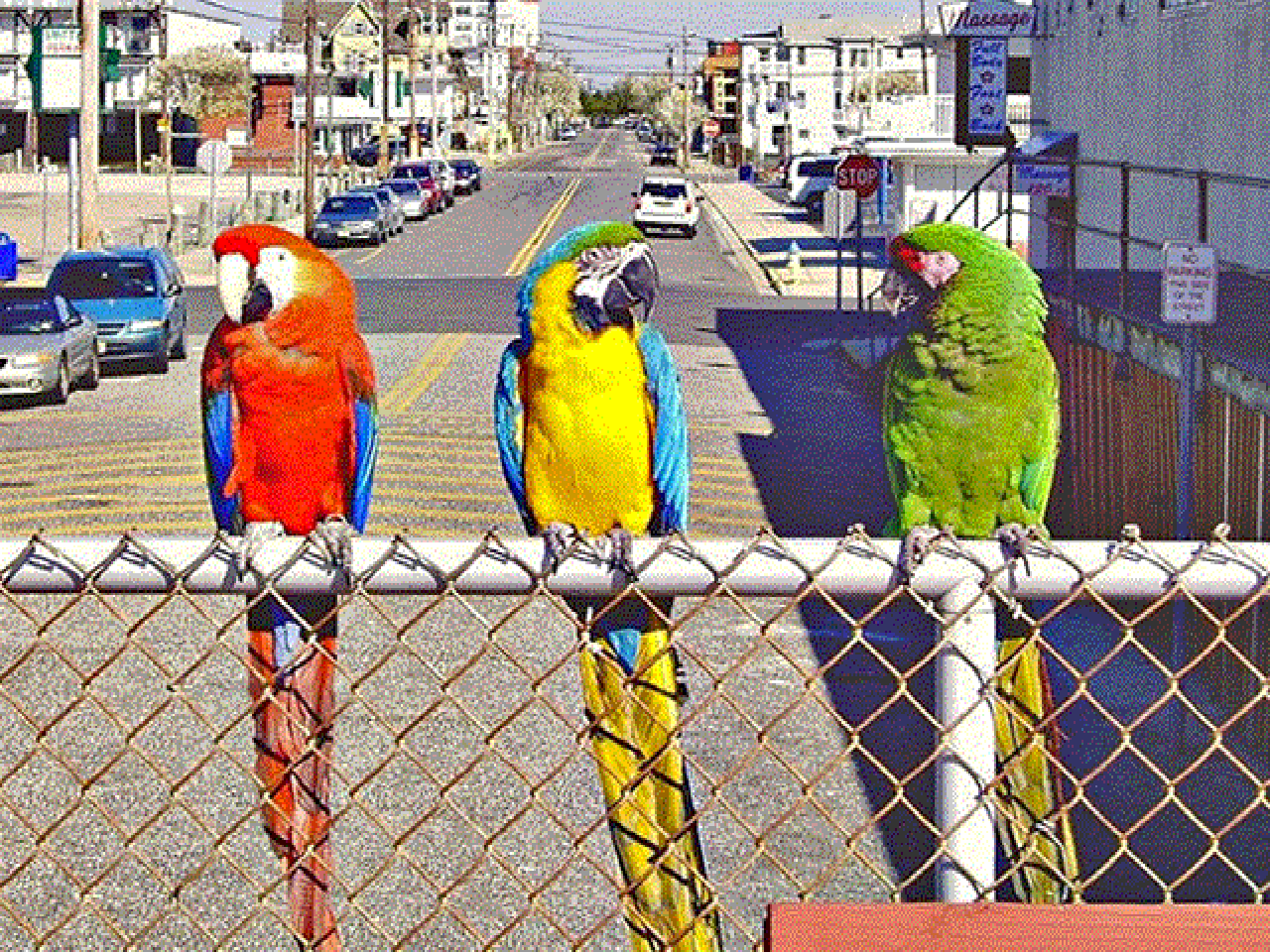
Simulated SVGA 640 × 400 image (corrected for aspect ratio)

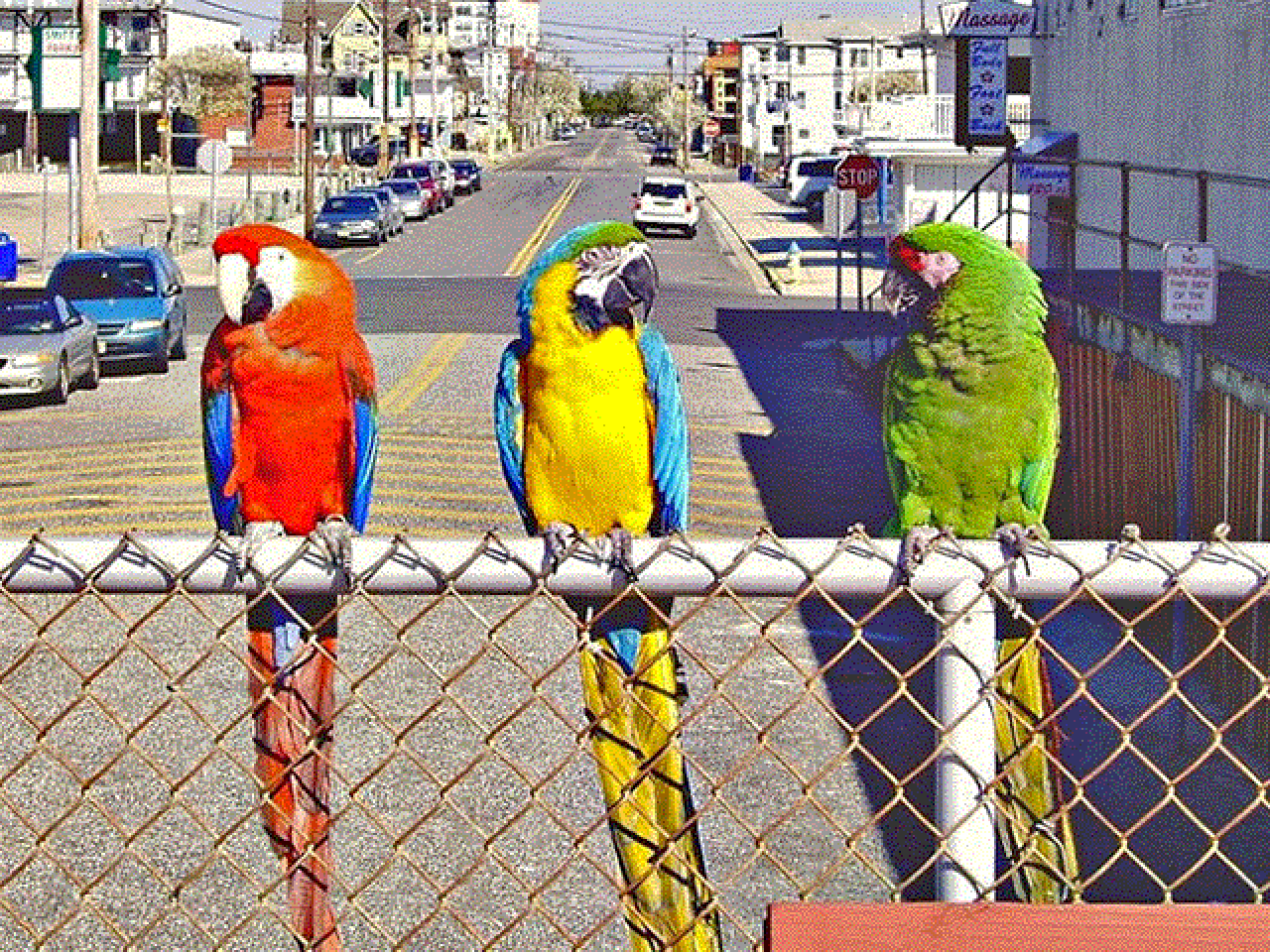
Simulated SVGA 640 × 480 image

The Super VGA standardized the following resolutions:

- 640 × 400 or 640 × 480 with 256 colors
- 800 × 600 with 256 colors
- 1024 × 768 with 256 colors
- 1280 × 1024 with 256 colors

SVGA uses the same DE-15 VGA connector as the original standard, and otherwise operates over the same cabling and interfaces as VGA.

== Early manufacturers ==
Some early Super VGA manufacturers and some of their models, where available:

- Ahead Technologies (Not related to Nero AG, formerly Ahead Software)
- Amdek: VGA ADAPTER/132 (Tseng Labs chipset)
- AST Research, Inc.: VGA Plus (rebranded Paradise)
- ATI Technologies: VIP (82C451), VGA Wonder
- Chips and Technologies: 82C451
- Cirrus Logic: CL-GD410/420
- Compaq: VGC Board (Paradise chipset)
- Everex
- Genoa Systems: Genoa VGA 5100-5400 (ET3000)
- Orchid Technology: Designer VGA (ET3000), Pro Designer Plus
- Western Digital's Paradise Inc.: VGA Plus (PVGA1), VGA Plus 16, VGA Pro
- Sigma Designs: SigmaVGA (ET3000)
- STB Systems: VGA Extra/EM (ET3000),
- Video Seven: V-RAM VGA
- Willow Peripherals: VGA-TV/Publisher's, VGA-TV + Genlock
- Trident Microsystems: TVGA8800, TVGA8900, and TVGA9000 series

== Gallery ==
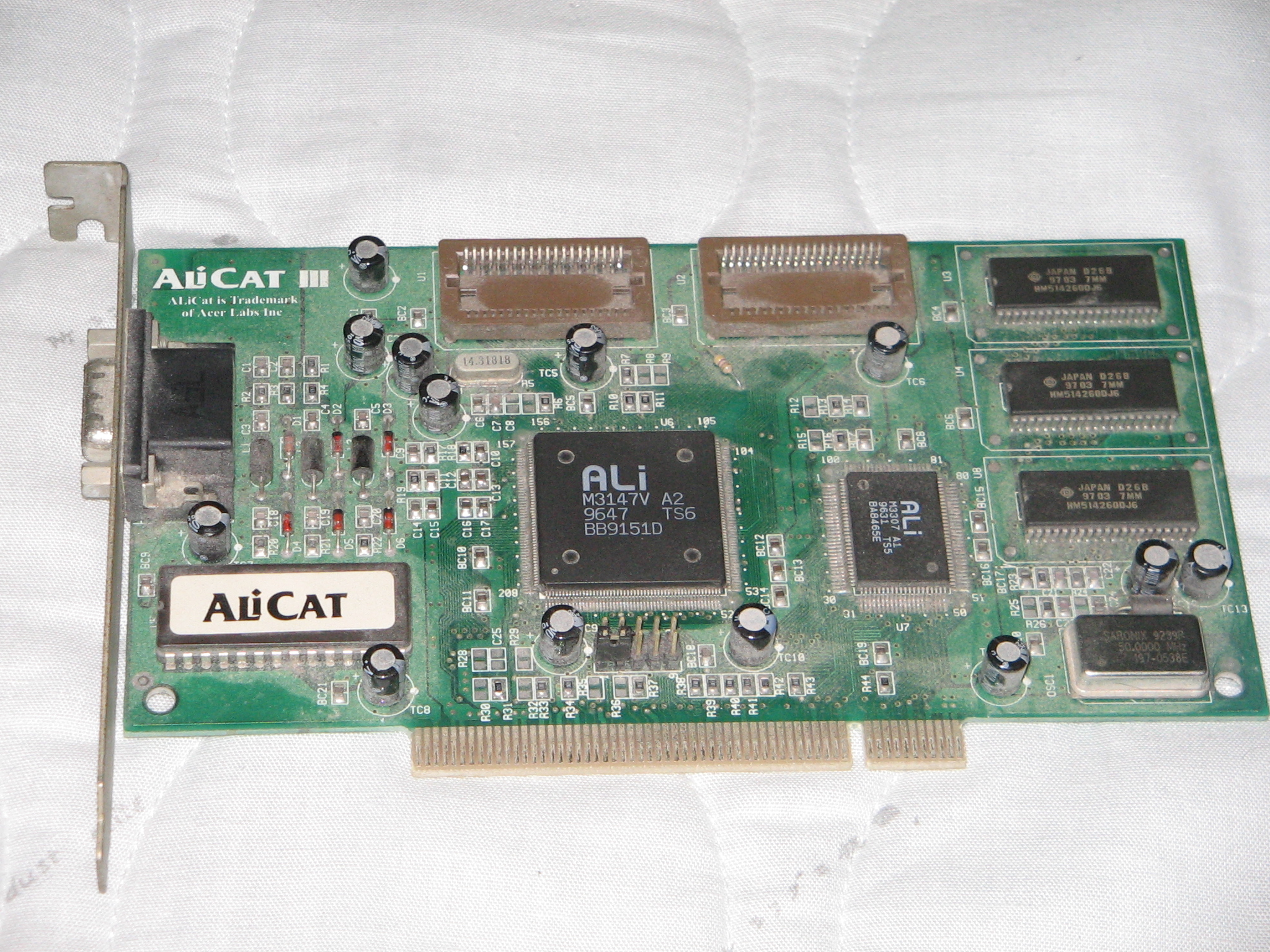
ALiCat M3147V SVGA video card

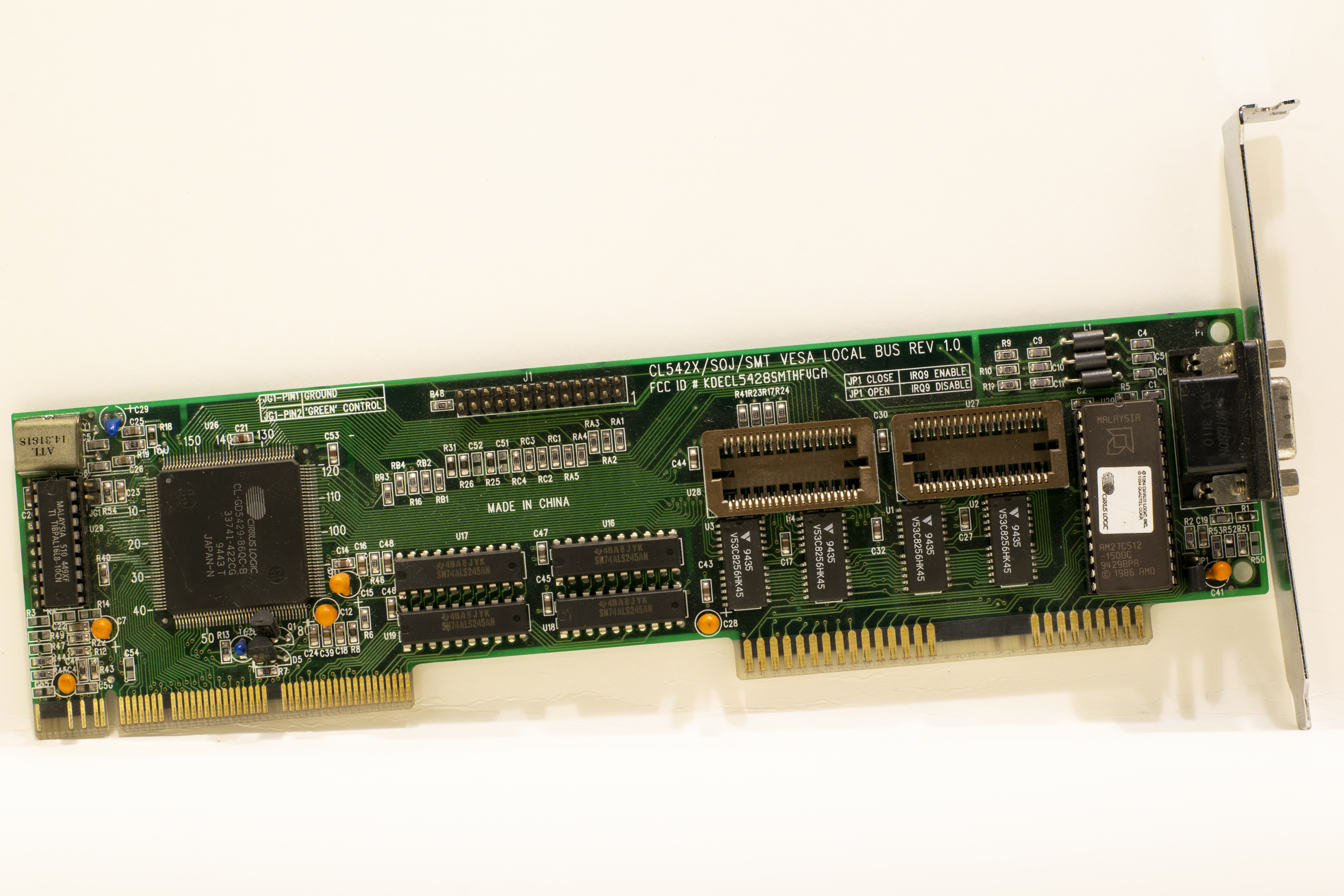
Cirrus Logic GD5429 VLB SVGA video card

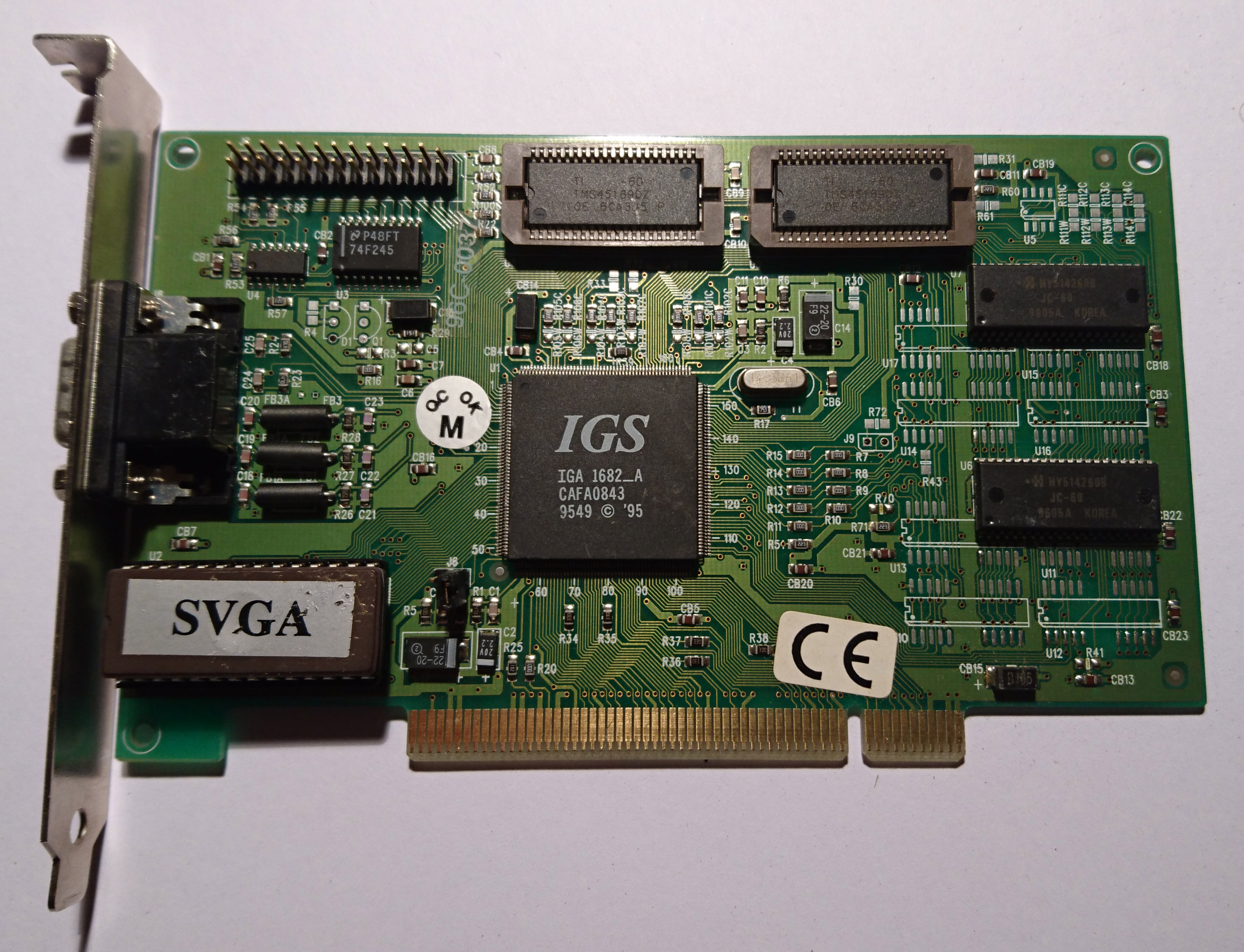
Early 1996 IGS IGA1682_A PCI SVGA video card

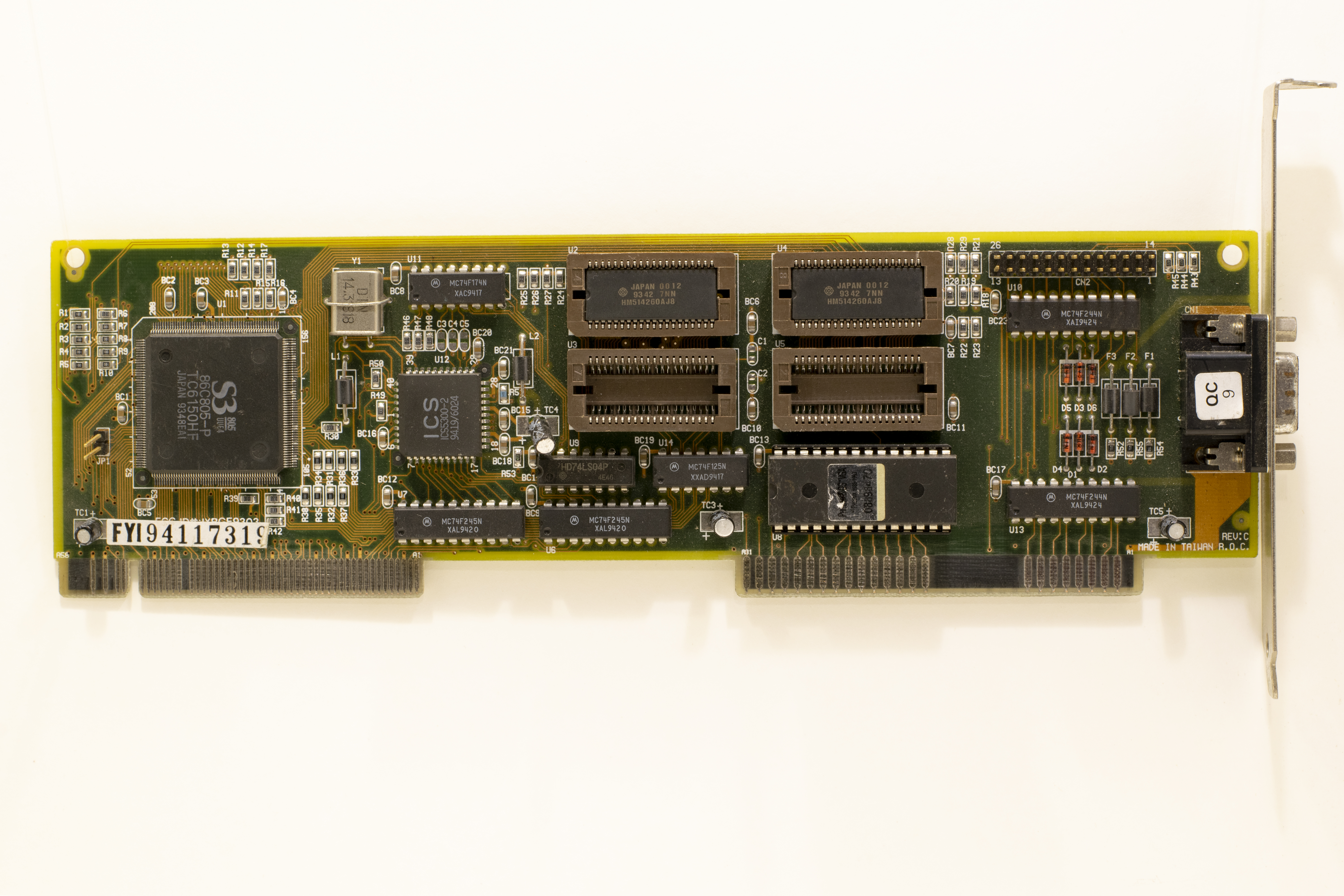
S3 805 VLB SVGA video card

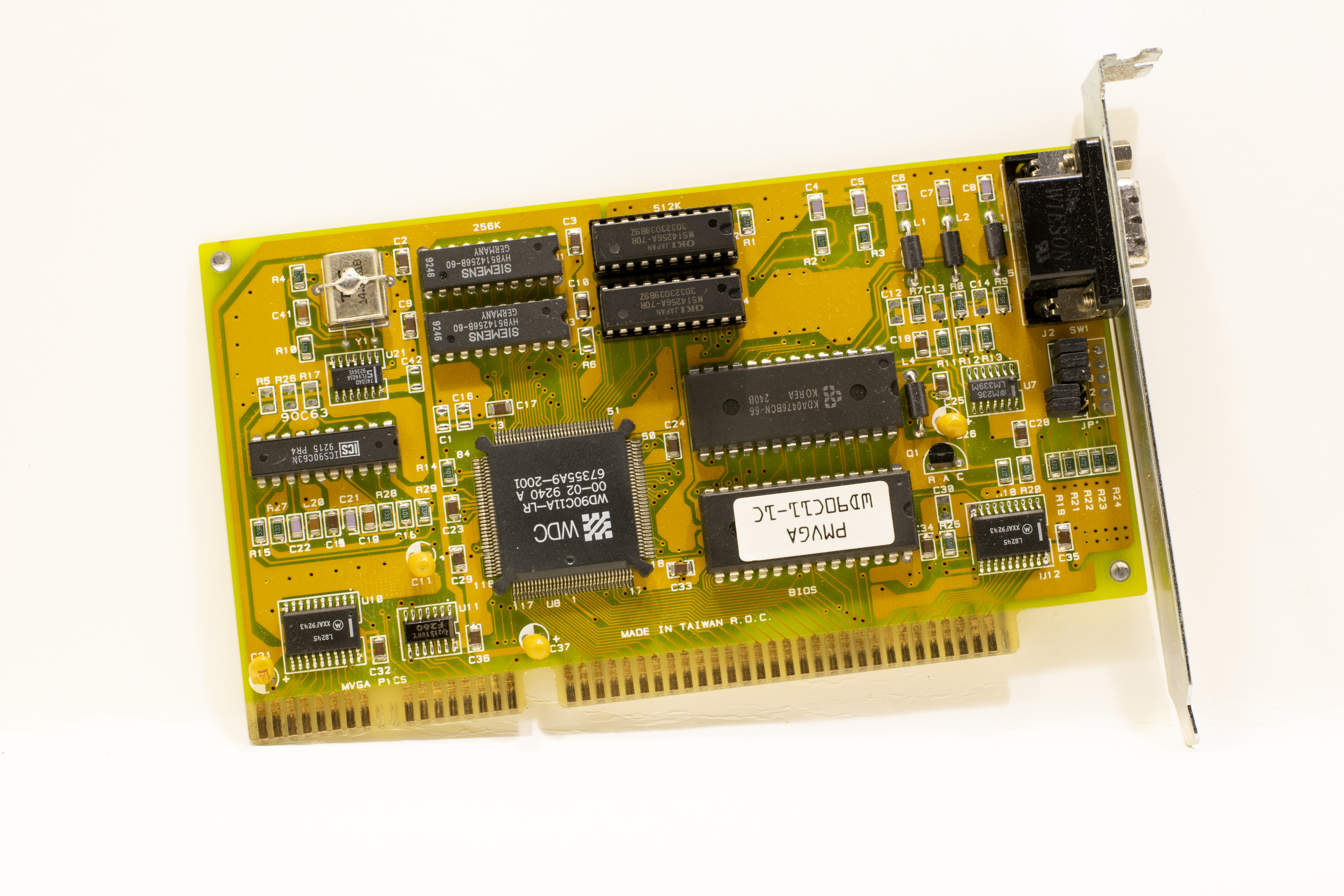
WDC ISA SVGA video card
