= Willow Peripherals =

Former American computer hardware company based in New York City

Willow Peripherals, Inc.
- Founded: 1984 in Manhattan, New York, United States
- Founders: Jonathan Vail; Bill Bares; Valerie Gardner; Calvin Berger; Howard Alexander
- Defunct: 2004; 22 years ago
- Fate: Dissolution
- Headquarters: Port Morris, New York, United States
- Number of employees: 25 (1992)

Willow Peripherals, Inc., was an American computer hardware company active from 1986 to 2004 and based in New York City. The company was well known for their frame grabber and television output adapter cards for the IBM Personal Computer and adapters. Willow was based in Port Morris in the South Bronx for most of its existence.

== History ==
Willow Peripherals was originally incorporated in Manhattan in 1984 by founders Jonathan Vail, Bill Bares, Valerie Gardner, Calvin Berger and Howard Alexander. The company's first products were generic expansion cards and peripherals for the IBM Personal Computer.

In 1986, the company moved to Port Morris in the South Bronx and began developing video-related products for the IBM PC shortly afterward. The company leased an 8,100-square-foot facility in Port Morris for a bargain $2 per square foot, a rate that barely grew in the decade that followed. The company however suffered from a lack of employees interested in working for the company, owing to the South Bronx's contemporary reputation for crime and urban decay. Between October 1992 and September 1993, the company's workforce dwindled from 25 workers to only 10. Manufacturing of Willow's products was originally done out of their Bronx headquarters, but owing to increasing restrictions on environmental safeguards in New York in the early 1990s, production was outsourced to a factory in Pennsylvania.

The company's first video-related product was the Publishers' VGA, a frame grabber expansion card, released in September 1988. The Publishers' VGA was relatively low-cost and had the advantage of being able to capture a single frame from a composite video source without the video source needing to be paused. The card tied in with Willow's Video Capture Software (VCAP), which could export the frame grab to a number of image file formats, including TIFF, PCX, and EPS.

Later in 1988, the company introduced the VGA-TV, a device which could output full VGA video over a composite signal, the first product on the market with this purpose. In 1990, the product was revised as the VGA-TV GE/O, which supported the superior S-Video signal, achieving near perfect reproduction of standard VGA pictures on certain equipped NTSC television sets, as well as genlocking, allowing multiple video sources to be overlaid through a video mixer without instability. The VGA-TV saw widespread use in many disparate areas, including in the White House, where it was used to pipe the output of PC teleprompter software for Presidents George H. W. Bush and Bill Clinton to read; as well as in the film industry, where it facilitated certain special effects.

Willow's website stopped updating in 2000 and went dark four years later.
