= Genoa Systems =

American computer multimedia peripheral vendor

Genoa Electronics Corporation
- Formerly: Genoa Systems Corporation (1984 – c. 1998)
- Company type: Private
- Industry: Computer
- Founded: 1984; 41 years ago in San Jose, California
- Founder: Frank C. Lin (co-founder)
- Defunct: 2002; 23 years ago
- Number of employees: 65 (1994)
- Parent: Ching Fong Investment Company

Genoa Systems Corporation, later Genoa Electronics Corporation, was an American computer multimedia peripheral vendor based in San Jose, California, and active from 1984 to 2002. The company was once a prolific and well-known manufacturer of video cards and chipsets. The company also dabbled in modems, tape drives, sound cards, and other peripheral expansion cards. Genoa was a founding member of the Video Electronics Standards Association (VESA) and was instrumental in the development of Super VGA.

== History ==
=== Foundation (1984–1987) ===
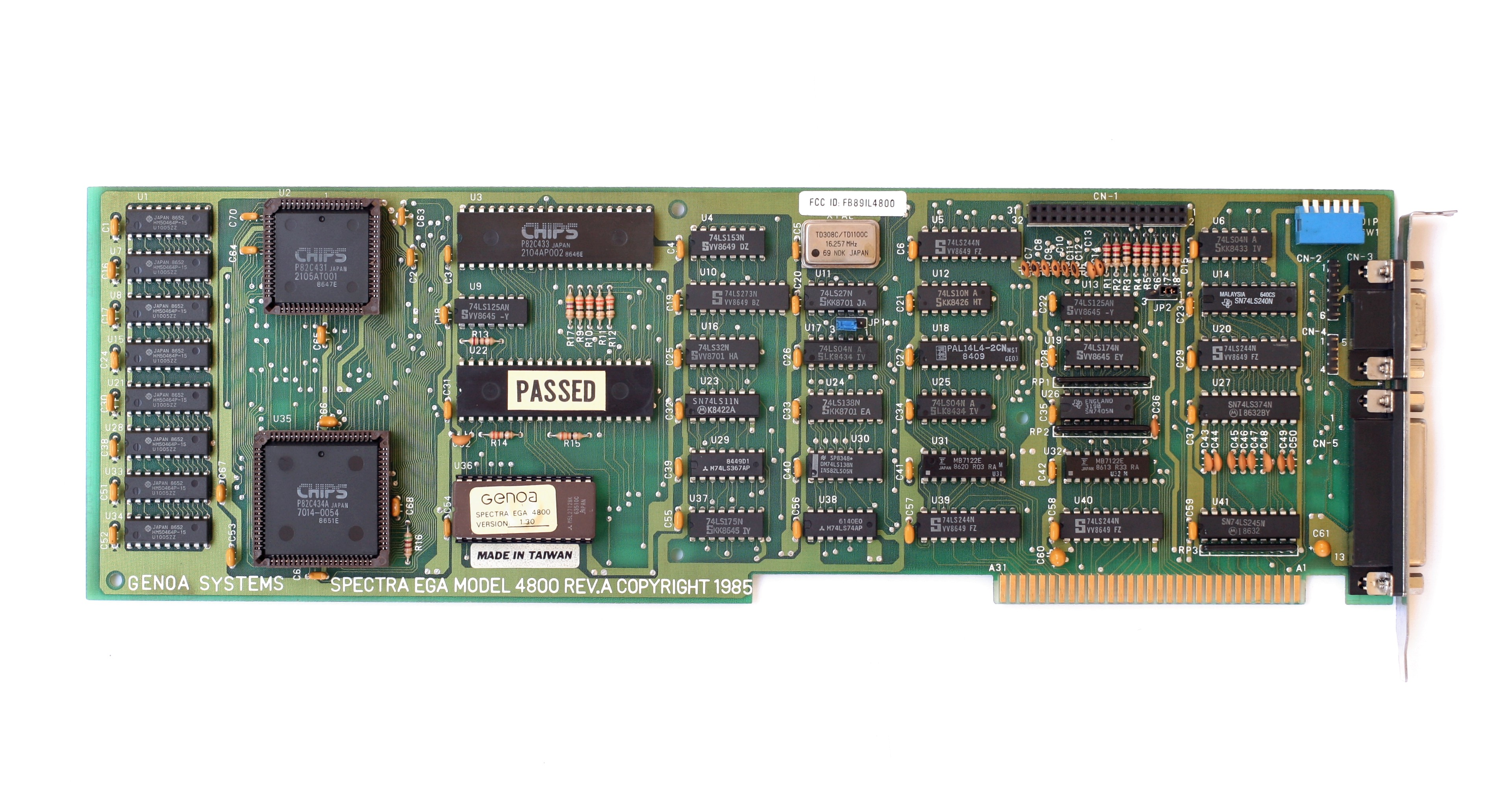
Genoa Systems Spectra EGA (Model 4800), ISA graphics card from 1985

Genoa Systems was founded in 1984 in San Jose, California, as a subsidiary of the Ching Fong Investment Company, a Taiwanese holding company headquartered in the United States in San Francisco. Genoa Systems was one of several high-tech companies that Ching Fong had founded in the early 1980s. Genoa's principal co-founder was Taiwan-born Frank C. Lin, who previously worked for Olivetti as a senior manager. He was named Genoa's president and served that role until 1987, when he left to found Trident Microsystems, a fabless semiconductor company, in Mountain View, California.

Genoa's first video-related product was the Spectrum Graphics Card in fall 1985. Released for the IBM Personal Computer and compatibles, the Spectrum combined multiple graphics adapter standards that were previously spread across multiple cards—CGA, MDA, Hercules, and Plantronics. Genoa released an updated variant of the Spectrum only a few months later in late 1985, the Spectrum Plus, which integrated many of the discrete chips necessary to drive the disparate graphics modes into one VLSI chip. In early 1986, they released the Spectra EGA, which InfoWorld evaluated as closely mimicking IBM's original Enhanced Graphics Adapter card—down to emulating its bugs when running certain software such as Lotus 1-2-3. In late 1986, the company released the Genoa SuperEGA board featuring their own bespoke chipset, which extended IBM's EGA standard by adding a resolution mode capable of displaying graphics at 640 by 480 pixels. It was also backwards compatible with CGA, MDA, and Hercules. The SuperEGA chipset was the first such product on the market, with Genoa beating out their competitors Chips and Technologies and Video Seven. As well as selling their own board featuring the chipset, Genoa sold the chipset to other manufacturers, in volume orders. In 1987, they extended the EGA standard further with the SuperEGA HiRes, which added a resolution mode capable of displaying 800-by-600-pixel graphics.

Genoa were also active in other areas of the PC marketplace, including internal and external modems (under the name NovaCom) and external backup tape drives (under the name Galaxy). By 1986, the company had over 1,000 dealers across the globe and posted annual sales of roughly $18 million.

=== Market success and VGA innovations (1987–1998) ===
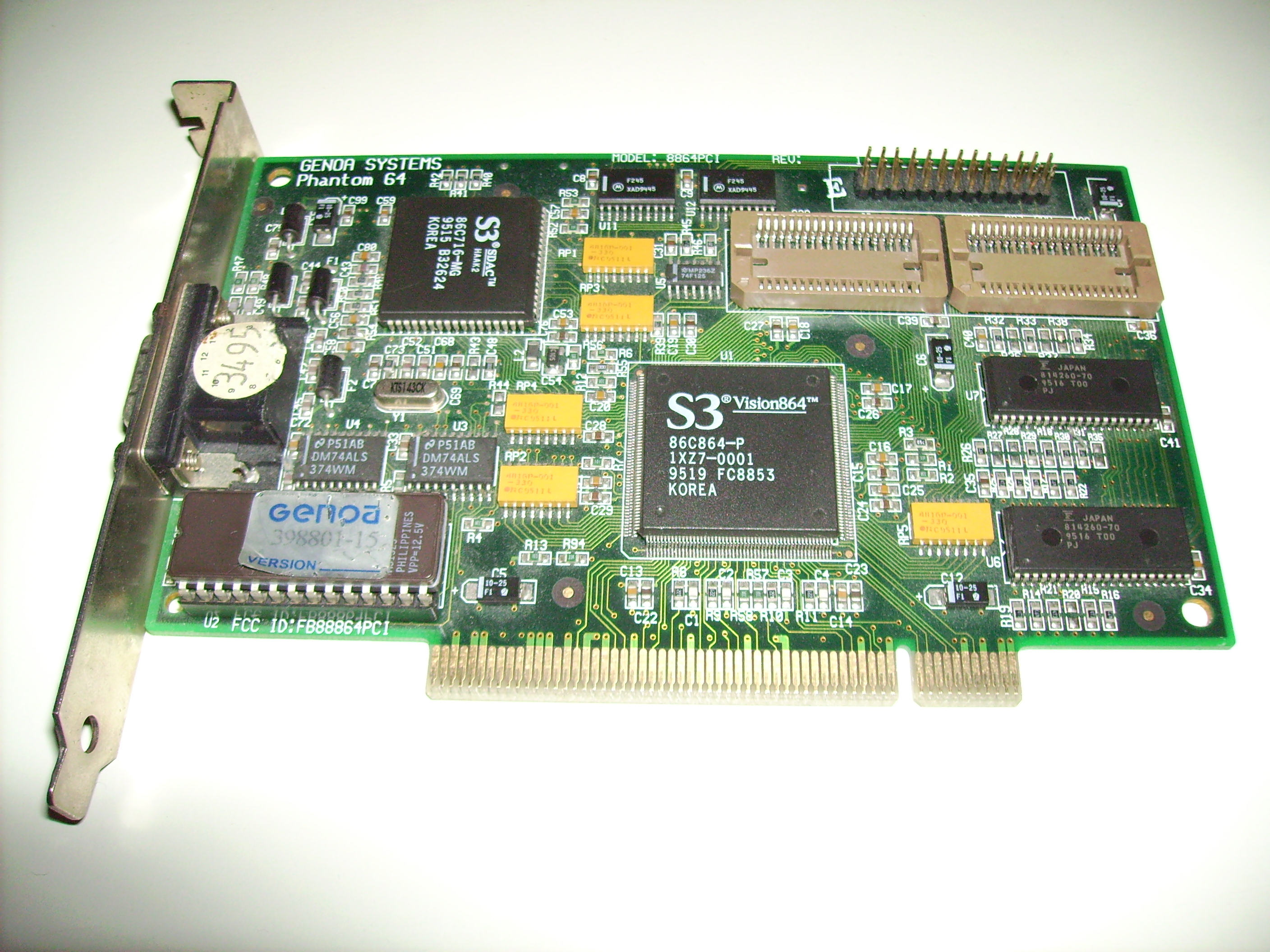
Genoa Systems Phantom 64, PCI graphics card based on the S3 Vision864 chipset, from 1995

After EGA was rendered obsolete by the release of IBM's Video Graphics Array (VGA) technology in 1987, Genoa pioneered a number of extensions to the VGA standard. These extensions were standardized and collectively known as Super VGA after the Video Electronics Standards Association (VESA) consortium was formed in November 1988. Genoa likely coined the term Super VGA with the release of the SuperVGA and SuperVGA HighRes boards in late 1987. Genoa was a founding member of VESA in 1988, along with Video Seven, STB Systems, Paradise Systems, Tecmar, and NEC. In January 1989, Genoa partnered with Western Digital (the parent company of Paradise Systems) and Sigma Designs to invest in Vitelic, a San Jose startup, who were planning on raising a DRAM fabrication plant in San Francisco.

In fall 1989, Genoa introduced a family of Super VGA graphics cards that were the first to offer 70 MHz refresh rates in VGA modes. These cards were compatible only with the professional multisync CRT monitors just coming on the market at the time but eliminated the perceived flicker that CRTs displaying 60 MHz signals tended to exhibit. The family of cards comprised the 8-bit ISA-based 6100 (with 512 KB of VRAM); the 16-bit ISA-based 6300 (with 256 KB of VRAM) and 6400 (with 512 KB of VRAM); and the 16-bit MCA-based 6600 (with 512 KB of VRAM).

The company began dabbling in sound cards for PCs starting in 1994, with the release of the AudioBlitz Classic. Models in the AudioBlitz range were mostly based on Yamaha OPL3 and OPL4 sound chips.

=== Decline (1998–2002) ===
In the last few years of its existence, Genoa moved its headquarters to Fremont, California, changed its name to Genoa Electronics Corporation, and focused on the development of an embedded computer marketed as an information and Internet appliance. Eventually realized as the Genoa Embedded Information Appliance (GEIA), it was marketed for use in kiosks in financial institutions and insurance companies, as thin clients for schools, and as set-top boxes for home use. The GEIA was a commercial flop, and by 2002, Genoa had folded completely.
