= Video Graphics Array =

Computer display standard and resolution

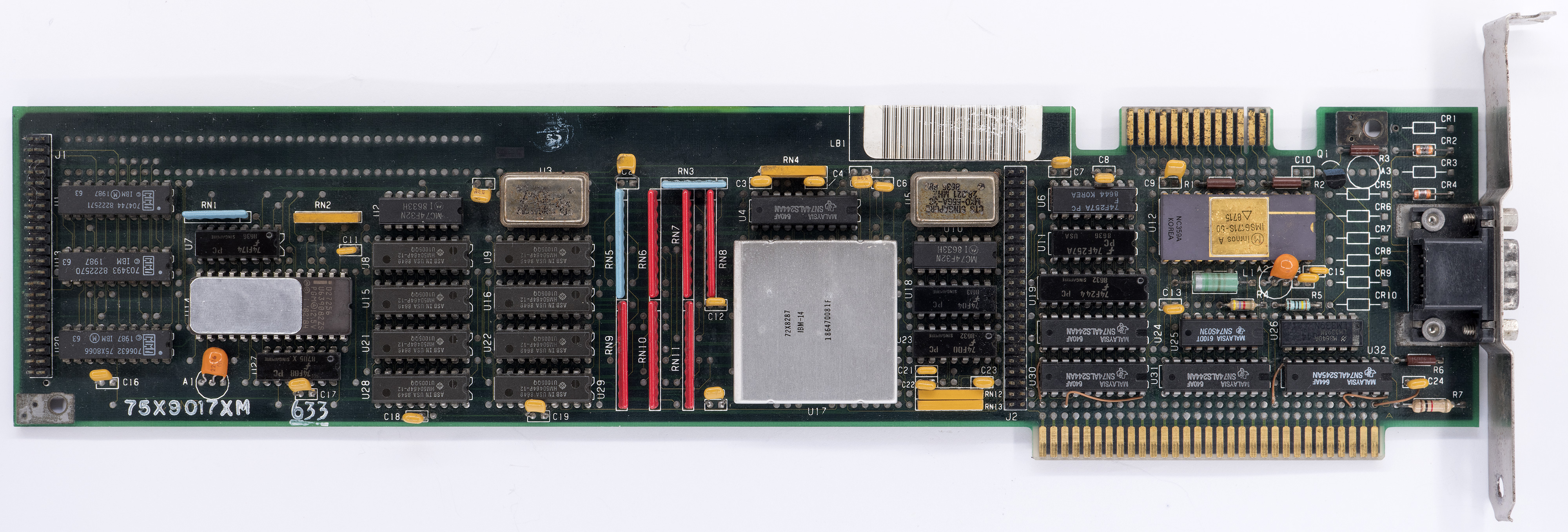
- Release date: April 2, 1987; 39 years ago

Cards
- Entry-level: Chips and Technologies 82c441; Video-7 VEGA Deluxe; ATI Graphics Solution Plus; S3 (911; 911A; 924; 801; 805; 805i; 928; 805p; 928p); Matrox MAGIC RGB; Paradise Systems PEGA 1; Tseng Labs ET3000; Cirrus Logic CL-GD400s
- Mid-range: ATI Wonder series; Paradise Systems PEGA 1a; S3 Vision; Tseng Labs ET4000; Cirrus Logic CL-GD500s
- High-end: ATI Mach series; Paradise Systems PEGA 2a; S3 Trio; Tseng Labs ET6000; Cirrus Logic CL-GD5000s

History
- Predecessor: Enhanced Graphics Adapter (EGA); Professional Graphics Controller (PGC)
- Successor: Super VGA (SVGA); Extended Graphics Array (XGA)

Video Graphics Array (VGA) is a video display controller and accompanying de facto graphics standard, first introduced with the IBM PS/2 line of computers in 1987, which became ubiquitous in the IBM PC compatible industry within three years. The term can now refer to the computer display standard, the 15-pin D-subminiature VGA connector, or the 640 × 480 resolution characteristic of the VGA hardware.

VGA was the last IBM graphics standard to which the majority of IBM PC compatible computer manufacturers conformed, making it the lowest common denominator that virtually all post-1990 PC graphics hardware can be expected to implement.

VGA was adapted into many extended forms by third parties, collectively known as Super VGA, then gave way to custom graphics processing units which, in addition to their proprietary interfaces and capabilities, continue to implement common VGA graphics modes and interfaces to the present day.

The VGA analog interface standard has been extended to support resolutions of up to 2048 × 1536 for general usage, with specialized applications improving it further still.

== Hardware design ==
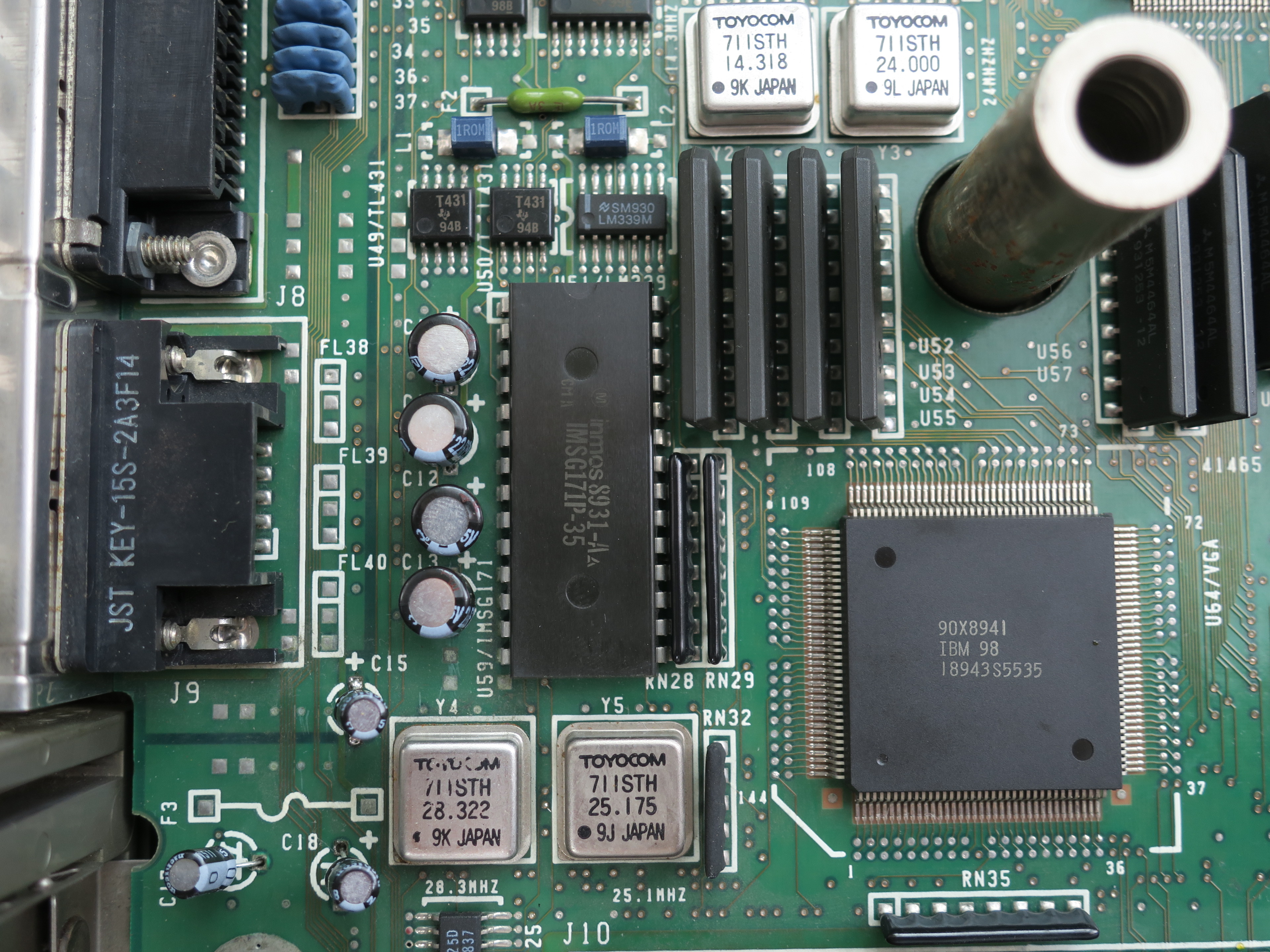
VGA section on the motherboard in IBM PS/55

The color palette random-access memory (RAM) and its corresponding digital-to-analog converter (DAC) were integrated into one chip (the RAMDAC) and the cathode-ray tube controller (CRTC) was integrated into a main VGA chip, which eliminated several other chips in previous graphics adapters, so VGA only additionally required external video RAM and timing crystals.

This small part count allowed IBM to include VGA directly on the PS/2 motherboard, in contrast to prior IBM PC models – PC, PC/XT, and PC AT – which required a separate display adapter installed in a slot in order to connect a monitor. The term array rather than adapter in the name denoted that it was not a completely independent expansion device, but a single component that could be integrated into a system.

Unlike the graphics adapters that preceded it (MDA, CGA, EGA and many third-party options), there was initially no discrete VGA card released by IBM. The first commercial implementation of VGA was a built-in component of the IBM PS/2, in which it was accompanied by 256 KiB of video RAM, and a new DE-15 connector replacing the DE-9 used by previous graphics adapters. IBM later released the standalone IBM PS/2 Display Adapter, which utilized the VGA but could be added to machines that did not have it built in.

On some machines and cables, pin 9 was missing. Pin 9's purpose is to power an EEPROM chip in the monitor, which tells the graphics card the capabilities on the monitor. Systems or cables missing this are likely using an older version of VGA.

== Capabilities ==
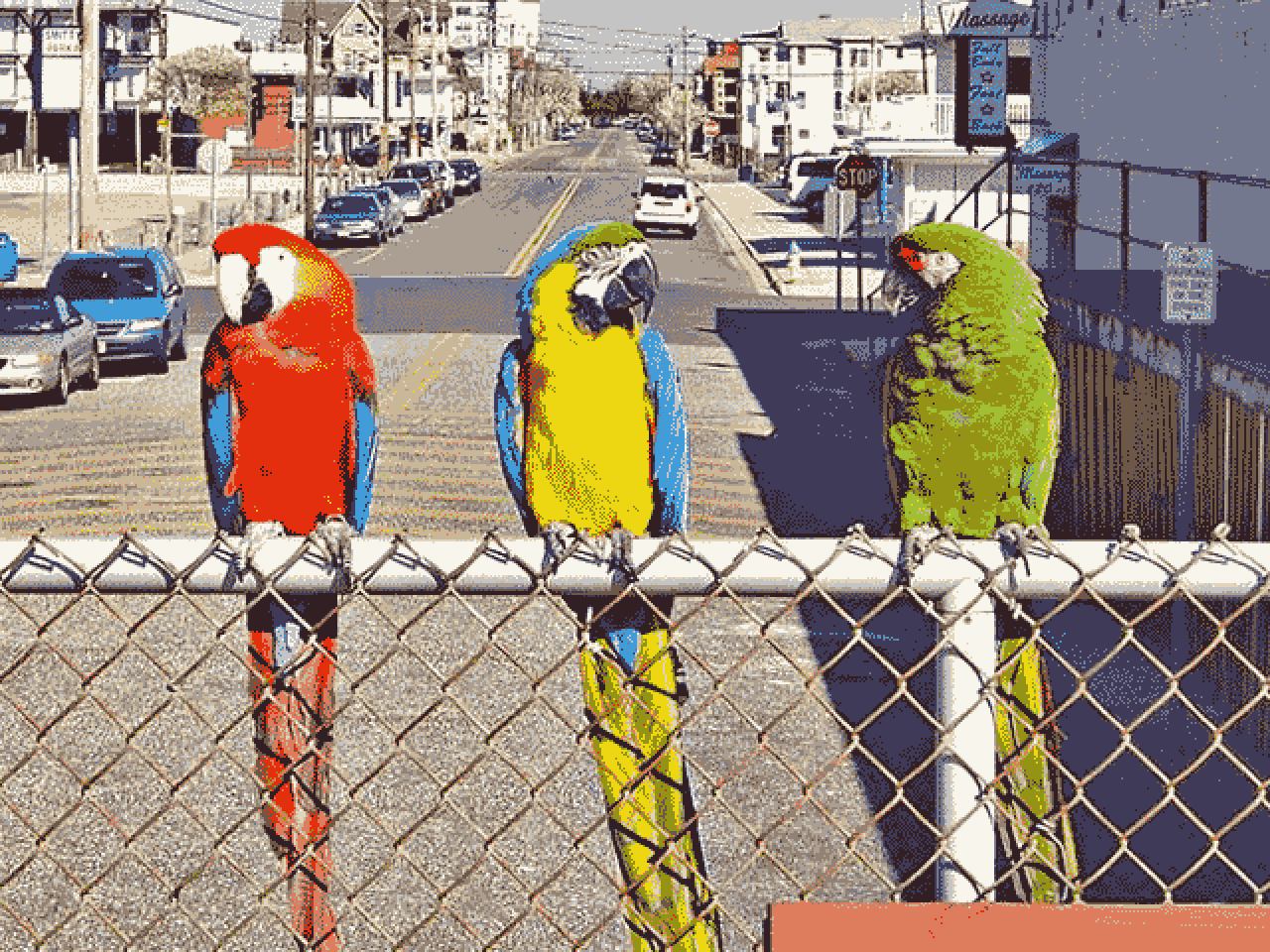
Simulated VGA 640 × 480 16 color image

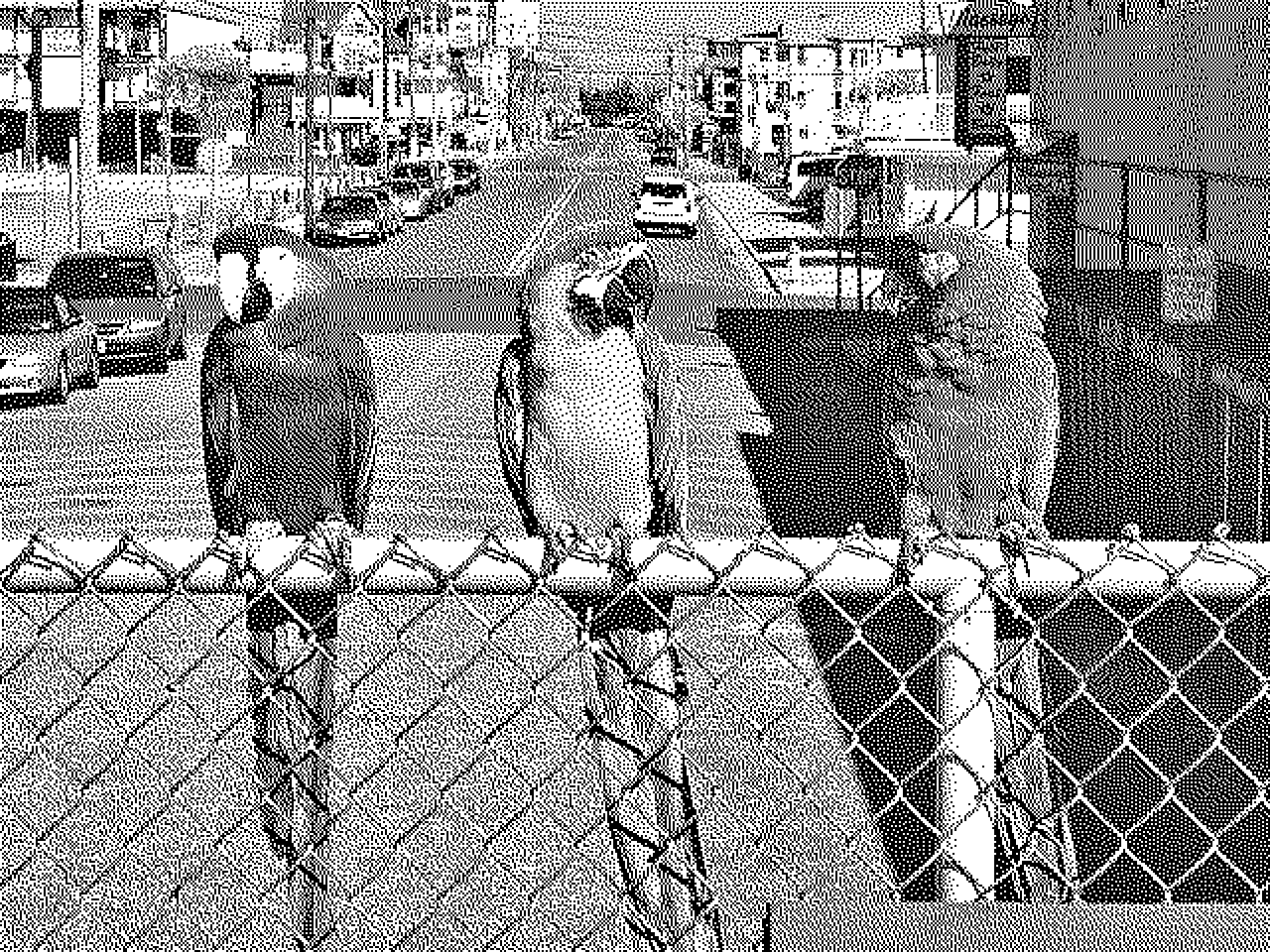
Simulated VGA 640 × 480 2 color image

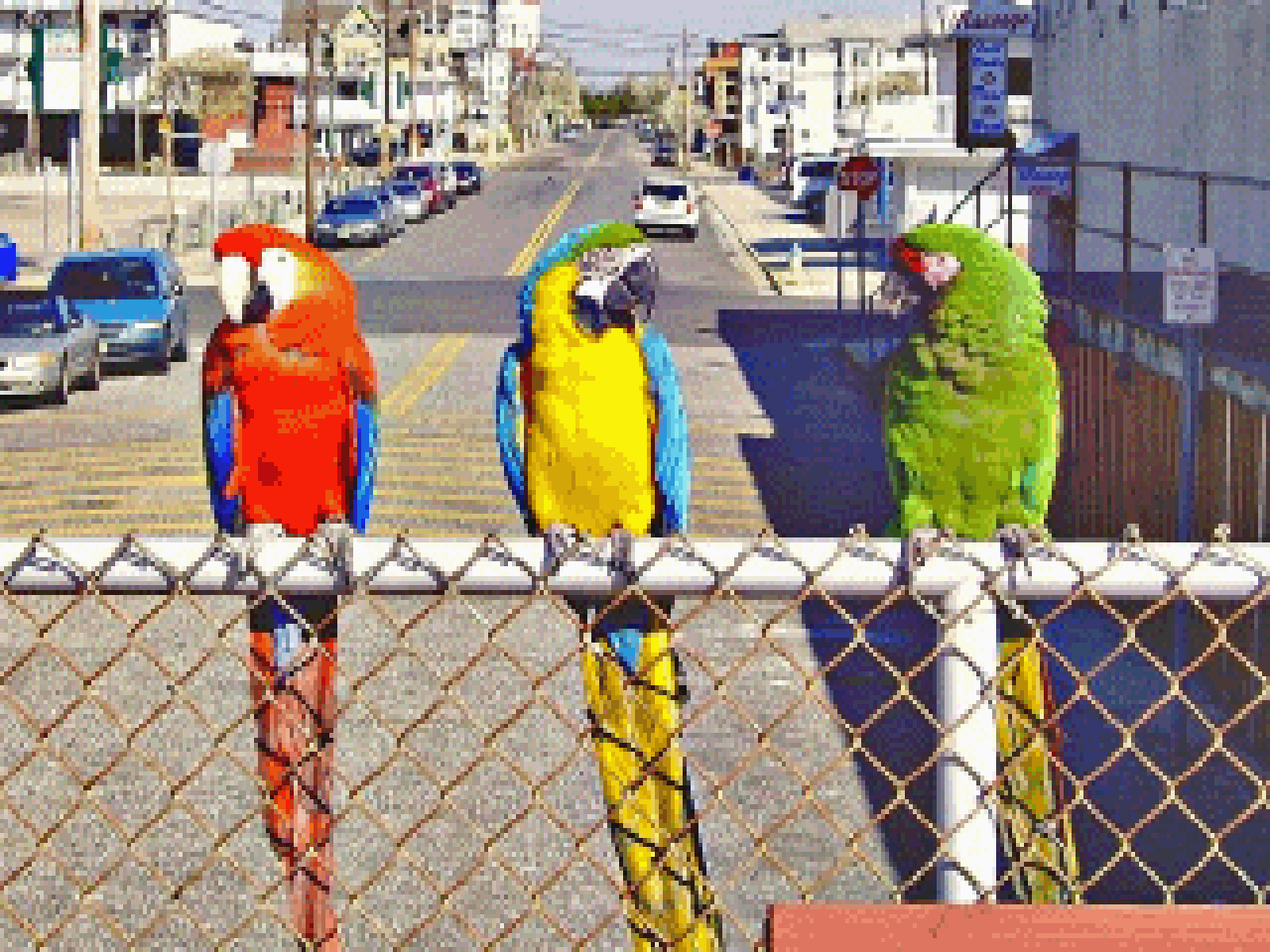
Simulated VGA 320 × 200 256 color image (corrected for aspect ratio)

Comparison of standard resolutions including VGA's 640 × 480

The VGA supports all graphics modes supported by the MDA, CGA and EGA cards, as well as multiple new modes.

=== Standard graphics modes ===
- 320 × 200 in 4 or 16 colors (CGA/EGA compatibility)
- 320 × 200 in 256 colors (Mode 13h)
- 640 × 200 and 640 × 350 in 16 colors or monochrome (CGA/EGA compatibility)
- 640 × 480 in 16 colors or monochrome

The 640 × 480 16-color and 320 × 200 256-color modes had fully redefinable palettes, with each entry selected from an 18-bit (262,144-color) gamut.

The other modes defaulted to standard EGA or CGA-compatible palettes and instructions, but still permitted remapping of the palette with VGA-specific commands.

==== 640 × 480 graphics mode ====
The 640 × 480 resolution (at 256 colors rather than 16) was originally used by IBM in PGC graphics (which VGA offers no backward compatibility for) but did not see wide adoption until VGA was introduced. As the VGA began to be cloned in great quantities by manufacturers who added ever-increasing capabilities, its 640 × 480, 16-color mode became the de facto lowest common denominator of graphics cards. By the mid 1990s, a 640 × 480×16 graphics mode using the VGA memory and register specifications was expected by operating systems such as Windows 95 and OS/2 Warp 3.0, which provided no support for lower resolutions or bit depths, or support for other memory or register layouts without additional drivers. Well into the 2000s, even after the VESA standard for graphics cards became commonplace, the "VGA" graphics mode remained a compatibility option for PC operating systems.

==== Other graphics modes ====
Nonstandard display modes can be implemented, with horizontal resolutions of:

- 512 to 800 pixels wide, in 16 colors
- 256 to 400 pixels wide, in 256 colors

And heights of:

- 200, or 350 to 410 lines (including 400-line) at 70 Hz refresh rate, or
- 224 to 256, or 448 to 512 lines (including 240- or 480-line) at 60 Hz refresh rate
- 512 to 600 lines at reduced vertical refresh rates (down to 50 Hz, and including e.g. 528, 544, 552, 560, 576-line), depending on individual monitor compatibility.

For example, high-resolution modes with square pixels are available at 768 × 576 or 704 × 528 in 16 colors, or medium-low resolution at 320 × 240 with 256 colors. Alternatively, extended resolution is available with "fat" pixels and 256 colors using, e.g., 400 × 600 (50 Hz) or 360 × 480 (60 Hz), and "thin" pixels, 16 colors and the 70 Hz refresh rate with e.g. 736 × 410 mode.

"Narrow" modes such as 256 × 224 tend to preserve the same pixel ratio as in e.g. 320 × 240 mode unless the monitor is adjusted to stretch the image out to fill the screen, as they are derived simply by masking down the wider mode instead of altering pixel or line timings, but can be useful for reducing memory requirements and pixel addressing calculations for arcade game conversions or console emulators.

The PC version of Pinball Fantasies has the option to use non-standard, "high res" modes, such as 640 × 350, allowing it to display a larger portion of the pinball table on screen. The game Scorched Earth uses a default resolution of 360 × 480, with many other nonstandard resolutions available.

=== Standard text modes ===
VGA also implements several text modes:

- 80 × 25, rendered with a 9 × 16 pixel font, with an effective resolution of 720 × 400
- 40 × 25, with a 9 × 16 font, with an effective resolution of 360 × 400
- 80 × 43 or 80 × 50, with an 8 × 8 font grid, with an effective resolution of 640 × 344 or 640 × 400 pixels.

As with the pixel-based graphics modes, additional text modes are possible by programming the VGA correctly, with an overall maximum of about 100 × 80 cells and an active area spanning about 88 × 64 cells.

One variant that is sometimes seen is 80 × 30 or 80 × 60, using an 8 × 16 or 8 × 8 font and an effective 640 × 480 pixel display, which trades use of the more flickery 60 Hz mode for an additional 5 or 10 lines of text and square character blocks (or, at 80 × 30, square half-blocks).

== Technical details ==
Unlike the cards that preceded it, which used binary TTL signals to interface with a monitor (and also composite, in the case of the CGA), the VGA introduced a video interface using pure analog RGB signals, with a range of 0.7 volts peak-to-peak max. In conjunction with a 18-bit RAMDAC (6-bit per RGB channel), this produced a color gamut of 262,144 colors.

The original VGA specifications follow:

- Selectable 25.175 MHz or 28.322 MHz master pixel clock
- Maximum of 640 horizontal pixels in graphics mode, and 720 pixels in text mode
- Maximum of 480 lines
- Refresh rates at 60 or 70 Hz (actually 59.94 and 70.086)
- Vertical blank interrupt (Not all clone cards support this.)
- Planar mode: up to 16 colors (4 bit planes)
- Packed-pixel mode: 256 colors (Mode 13h)
- Hardware smooth scrolling support
- No Blitter
  - Supports fast data transfers via "VGA latch" registers
- Barrel shifter
- Split screen support

There are two types of "video modes" to be distinguished: the mode as perceived by the display and the mode as perceived by the BIOS and higher software. The former is solely defined by the timing characteristics of the display signal. The latter is defined not only by the intended display signal, but also the data the VGA card uses to generate the signal: either a grid of characters (text mode) or a grid of pixels (a framebuffer, graphics mode), with a varying amount of data dedicated to color information. As a result, each display mode can correspond to multiple BIOS modes.

=== Signal timings ===
The intended standard value for the line frequency of VGA's 640 × 480 mode (31.469 kHz = 25.175 MHz / 800 = 28.322 MHz / 900) is exactly double the value used in the CCIR System M (used in NTSC-M) video system (15.734 kHz), as this made it much easier to offer optional TV-out solutions or external VGA-to-TV converter boxes at the time of VGA's development.

In the well-known 640 × 480@60 mode, there are 525 lines per field (480 of which are visible) with a field frequency of 59.94 Hz, the same as NTSC-M. Each horizontal line runs for 31.778 μs and contains 800 pixels, 640 of which are addressable. The doubling of the clock is due to VGA using a progressive (480p) scanning mode as opposed to the interlaced (480i) mode of NTSC-M.

(For this most common VGA mode, the horizontal timings can be found in the HP Super VGA Display Installation Guide and in other places.)

The line frequency is slightly more than twice that of CGA (15.700 kHz), which supported both NTSC and composite monitors. (Although not an exact match of the specified NTSC H-freq, CGA signal lies within the tolerance of receivers.)

==== Non-standard timings ====
All derived VGA timings (i.e., those which use the master 25.175 and 28.322 MHz crystals and, to a lesser extent, the nominal 31.469 kHz line rate) can be varied by software that bypasses the VGA firmware interface and communicates directly with the VGA hardware, as many MS-DOS-based games did. However, only the standard modes, or modes that at least use almost exactly the same H-sync and V-sync timings as one of the standard modes, can be expected to work with the original late-1980s and early-1990s VGA monitors. The use of other timings may, in fact, damage such monitors and thus was usually avoided by software publishers.

Third-party multisync monitors were more flexible, and in combination with super EGA, VGA, and later SVGA graphics cards using extended modes, could display a much wider range of resolutions and refresh rates at arbitrary sync frequencies and pixel clock rates.

=== Typical uses of selected modes ===
640×480 @ 60 Hz
This "standard VGA" mode is the default Windows graphics mode (usually with 16 colors), up to Windows 2000. It remains an option in XP and later versions via the boot menu "low resolution video" option and per-application compatibility mode settings, despite newer versions of Windows now defaulting to 1024 × 768 and generally not allowing any resolution below 800 × 600 to be set.
The need for such a low-quality, universally compatible fallback has diminished since the turn of the millennium, as VGA-signalling standard screens or adaptors unable to show anything beyond the original resolutions have become increasingly rare.
640×400 / 320×200 @ 70 Hz
720×400 / 720×350 @ 70 Hz
These modes are the same to the monitor: they all have a 31.469 kHz line, and 70.086 Hz field. There are 449 lines per field (320×200 is presented as 640×400 to the display through double-scanning in the VGA card). As a result, the display does not need to re-synchronize when switching between these modes, which could otherwise have taken several seconds. (The 25.175 MHz pixel clock is used on the former two for 800 pixels per line, and the 28.322 MHz on the latter two for 900 pixels per line.)
720 × 400 @ 70 Hz is traditionally the mode used for booting VGA-compatible x86 personal computers. It is almost always backed by a text mode having a 80 × 25 character grid with 9 × 16-sized characters.
The Windows 95/98/Me LOGO.SYS boot-up image was 320 × 400 resolution, displayed with pixel-doubling to present a 640 × 400 at 70 Hz signal to the monitor. Pressing Esc to return to text mode would be instant due to not needing re-sync.
A 640 × 400 @ 70 Hz "text mode" is used by MS-DOS for system boot. (Because there is no VGA text mode for 640 × 400 (only a VESA one), it is likely a doubling of the 320 × 200 text modes 0 and 1 inherited from CGA.)
This convention for boot resolution has been eroded in recent years, however, with POST and BIOS screens moving to higher resolutions, taking advantage of EDID data to match the resolution to a connected monitor.
320 × 200 was also the most common mode for early 1990s PC games, with pixel-doubling and line-doubling performed in hardware to present a 640 × 400 at 70 Hz signal to the monitor.
640×350 @ 70 Hz
This mode uses the same frequency parameters as the three above, but has opposite sync-signal polarities. It provides compatibility with EGA, an "EGA on VGA" mode.

The three above represent the three "standard" VGA modes supposed to be supported by all VGA cards. They are invoked through the standard int 10h firmware interface without resorting to direct hardware communication.

== Connector ==
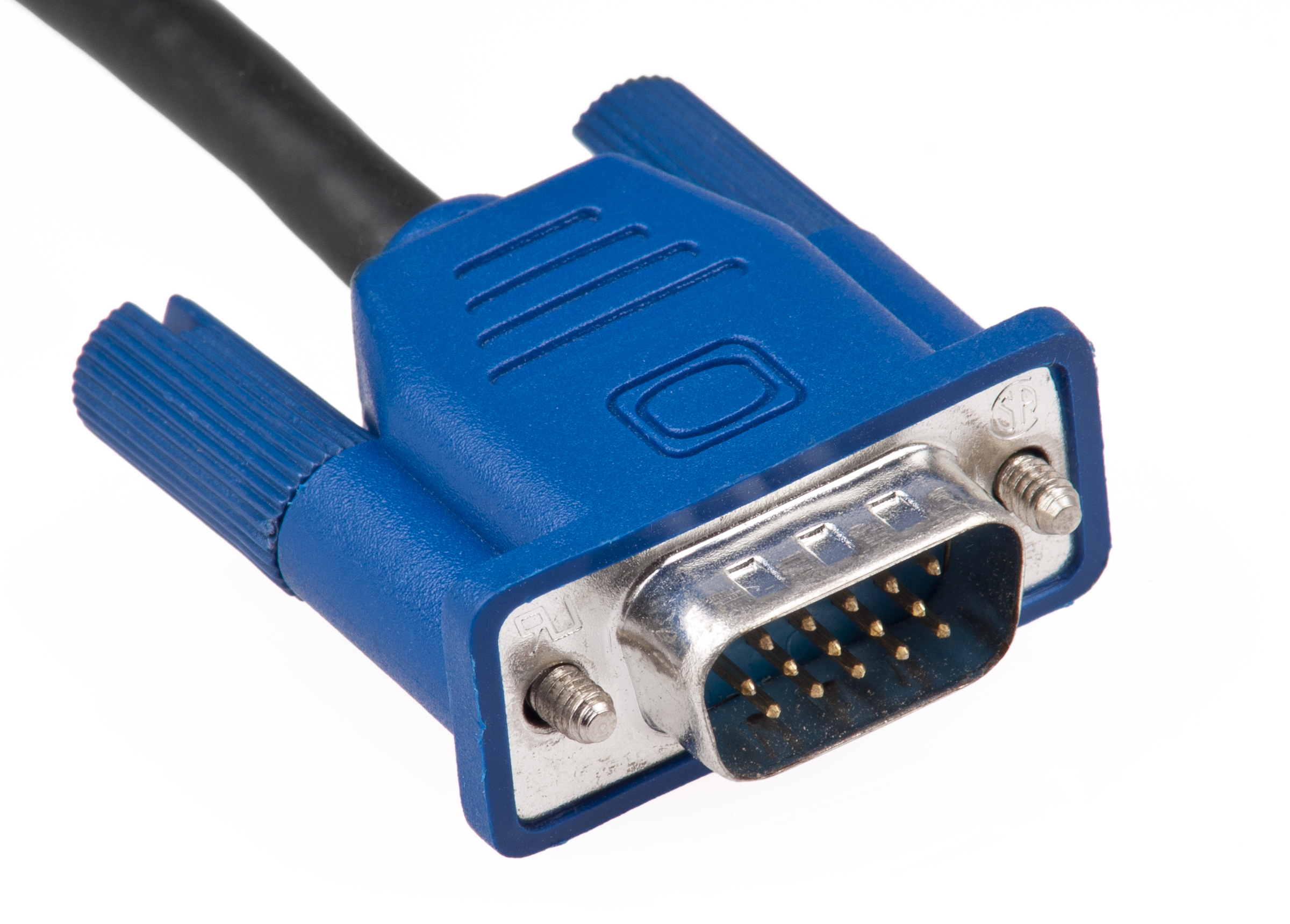
A standard VGA connector

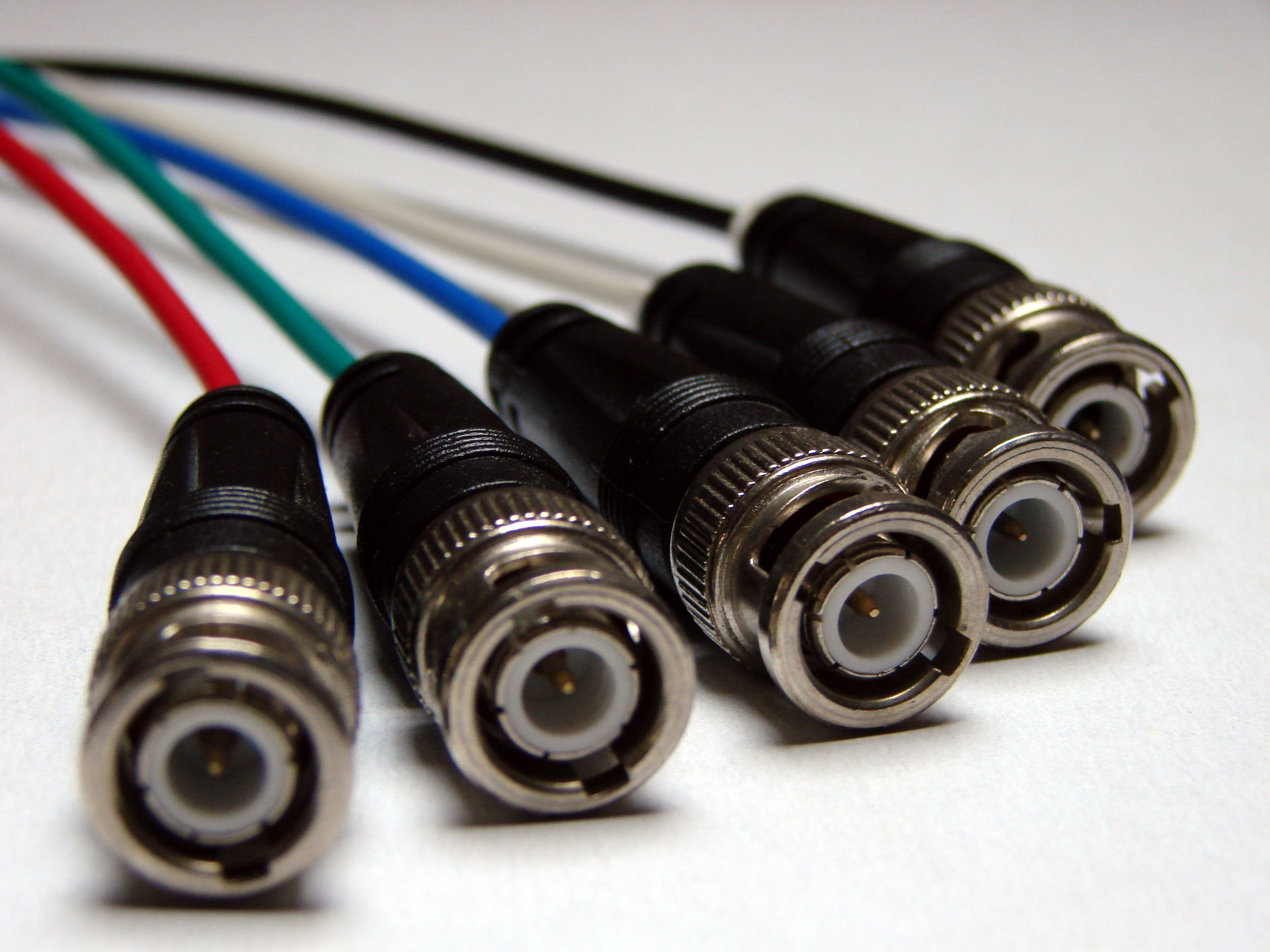
VGA BNC connectors

The standard VGA monitor interface is a 15-pin D-subminiature connector in the "E" shell, variously referred to as DE-15, HD-15 and DB-15(HD).

All VGA connectors carry analog RGBHV (red, green, blue, horizontal sync, vertical sync) video signals. Modern connectors also include VESA DDC pins for identifying attached display devices.

Because VGA uses low-voltage analog signals, signal degradation becomes a factor with low-quality or overly long cables. Solutions include shielded cables, cables that include a separate internal coaxial cable for each color signal, and "broken out" cables utilizing a separate coaxial cable with a BNC connector for each color signal.

BNC breakout cables typically use five connectors, one each for Red, Green, Blue, Horizontal Sync, and Vertical Sync, and do not include the other signal lines of the VGA interface. With BNC, the coaxial wires are fully shielded end-to-end and through the interconnect so that virtually no crosstalk and very little external interference can occur. The use of BNC RGB video cables predates VGA in other markets and industries.

== Color palette ==
VGA 256 default color palette

VGA palette organised into 4 groups

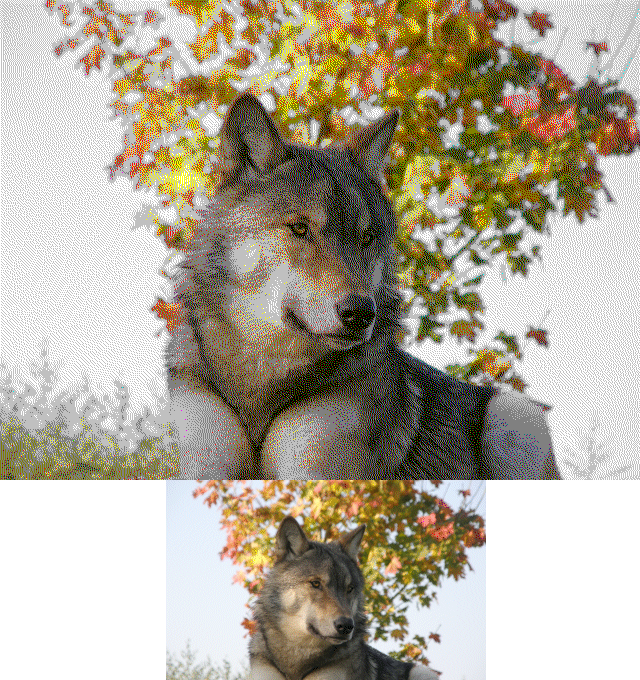
Examples of VGA images in 640×480 with 16 colors and 320×200 with 256 colors (bottom). Dithering is used to mask color limitations.

The VGA color system uses register-based palettes to map colors in various bit depths to its 18-bit output gamut. It is backward compatible with the EGA and CGA adapters, but supports extra bit depth for the palette when in these modes.

For instance, when in EGA 16-color modes, VGA offers 16 palette registers, and in 256-color modes, it offers 256 registers. Each palette register contains a 3×6 bit RGB value, selecting a color from the 18-bit gamut of the DAC.

These color registers are initialized to default values IBM expected to be most useful for each mode. For instance, EGA 16-color modes initialize to the default CGA 16-color palette, and the 256-color mode initializes to a palette consisting of 16 CGA colors, 16 gray shades, and then 216 colors chosen by IBM to fit expected use cases. After initialization, they can be redefined at any time without altering the contents of video RAM, permitting palette cycling.

In the 256-color modes, the DAC is set to combine four 2-bit color values, one from each plane, into an 8-bit value representing an index into the 256-color palette. The CPU interface combines the 4 planes in the same way, a feature called "chain-4", so that each pixel appears to the CPU as a packed 8-bit value representing the palette index.

== Use ==
The video memory of the VGA is mapped to the PC's memory via a window in the range between segments 0xA0000 and 0xBFFFF in the PC's real mode address space (A000:0000 and B000:FFFF in segment:offset notation). Typically, these starting segments are:

- 0xA0000 for EGA/VGA graphics modes (64 KB)
- 0xB0000 for monochrome text mode (32 KB)
- 0xB8000 for color text mode and CGA-compatible graphics modes (32 KB)

A typical VGA card also provides this port-mapped I/O segment:

- 0x3B0 to 0x3DF

Due to the use of different address mappings for different modes, it is possible to have a monochrome adapter (i.e., MDA or Hercules) and a color adapter such as the VGA, EGA, or CGA installed in the same machine.

At the beginning of the 1980s, this was typically used to display Lotus 1-2-3 spreadsheets in high-resolution text on a monochrome display and associated graphics on a low-resolution CGA display simultaneously. Many programmers also used such a setup with the monochrome card displaying debugging information while a program ran in graphics mode on the other card. Several debuggers, like Borland's Turbo Debugger, D86 and Microsoft's CodeView could work in a dual monitor setup. Either Turbo Debugger or CodeView could be used to debug Windows.

There were also device drivers such as ox.sys, which implemented a serial interface simulation on the monochrome display and, for example, allowed the user to receive crash messages from debugging versions of Windows without using an actual serial terminal.

It is also possible to use the "MODE MONO" command at the command prompt to redirect the output to the monochrome display. When a monochrome adapter was not present, it was possible to use the 0xB000–0xB7FF address space as additional memory for other programs.

A VGA-capable PCI / PCIe graphics card can provide legacy VGA registers in its PCI configuration space, which may be remapped by BIOS or operating system.

=== Programming ===
"Unchaining" the 256 KB VGA memory into four separate "planes" makes VGA's 256 KB of RAM available in 256-color modes. There is a trade-off for extra complexity and performance loss in some types of graphics operations, but this is mitigated by other operations becoming faster in certain situations:

- Single-color polygon filling could be accelerated due to the ability to set four pixels with a single write to the hardware.
- The video adapter could assist in copying video RAM regions, which was sometimes faster than doing this with the relatively slow CPU-to-VGA interface.
- The use of multiple video pages in hardware allowed double buffering, triple buffering or split screens, which, while available in VGA's 320 × 200 16-color mode, was not possible using stock Mode 13h.
- Most particularly, several higher, arbitrary-resolution display modes were possible, all the way up to the programmable limit of 800 × 600 with 16 colors (or 400 × 600 with 256 colors), as well as other custom modes using unusual combinations of horizontal and vertical pixel counts in either color mode.

Software such as Fractint, Xlib and ColoRIX also supported tweaked 256-color modes on standard adaptors using freely-combinable widths of 256, 320, and 360 pixels and heights of 200, 240 and 256 (or 400, 480 and 512) lines, extending still further to 384 or 400 pixel columns and 576 or 600 (or 288, 300). However, 320 × 240 was the best known and most frequently used, as it offered a standard 40-column resolution and 4:3 aspect ratio with square pixels. "320 × 240 × 8" resolution was commonly called Mode X, the name used by Michael Abrash when he presented the resolution in Dr. Dobb's Journal.

The highest resolution modes were only used in special, opt-in cases rather than as standard, especially where high line counts were involved. Standard VGA monitors had a fixed line scan (H-scan) rate – multisync monitors being, at the time, expensive rarities – and so the vertical/frame (V-scan) refresh rate had to be reduced in order to accommodate them, which increased visible flicker and thus eye strain. For example, the highest 800 × 600 mode, being otherwise based on the matching SVGA resolution (with 628 total lines), reduced the refresh rate from 60 Hz to about 50 Hz (and 832 × 624, the theoretical maximum resolution achievable with 256 KB at 16 colors, would have reduced it to about 48 Hz, barely higher than the rate at which XGA monitors employed a double-frequency interlacing technique to mitigate full-frame flicker).

These modes were also outright incompatible with some monitors, producing display problems such as picture detail disappearing into overscan (especially in the horizontal dimension), vertical roll, poor horizontal sync or even a complete lack of picture depending on the exact mode attempted. Due to these potential issues, most VGA tweaks used in commercial products were limited to more standards-compliant, "monitor-safe" combinations, such as 320 × 240 (square pixels, three video pages, 60 Hz), 320 × 400 (double resolution, two video pages, 70 Hz), and 360 × 480 (highest resolution compatible with both standard VGA monitors and cards, one video page, 60 Hz) in 256 colors, or double the horizontal resolution in 16-color mode.

== Hardware manufacturers ==
IBM introduced its first VGA hardware in April 1987. Within six months, clones were available.

- ATI: Graphics Solution Plus, Wonder series, Mach series
- S3 Graphics: S3 911, 911A, 924, 801, 805, 805i, 928, 805p, 928p, S3 Vision series, S3 Trio series
- Matrox: MAGIC RGB
- Plantronics: Colorplus
- Paradise Systems: PEGA 1, PEGA 1a, PEGA 2a
- Tseng Labs: ET3000, ET4000, ET6000
- Cirrus Logic: CL-GD400, CL-GD500 and CL-GD5000 series
- Trident Microsystems: TVGA 8000 series, TVGA 9000 series, TGUI9000 series
- IIT
- NEC
- Chips and Technologies
- SiS
- Tamerack
- Realtek
- Oak Technology
- LSI
- Hualon
- Cornerstone Imaging
- Winbond
- AMD
- Western Digital
- Intergraph
- Texas Instruments
- Gemini (defunct)
- Genoa Systems (defunct)

== Successors ==
=== Super VGA (SVGA) ===
Super VGA (SVGA) is a display standard developed in 1988, when NEC Home Electronics announced its creation of the Video Electronics Standards Association (VESA). The development of SVGA was led by NEC, along with other VESA members including ATI Technologies and Western Digital. SVGA enabled graphics display resolutions up to 800 × 600 pixels, 56% more than VGA's maximum resolution of 640 × 480 pixels.

=== Extended Graphics Array (XGA) ===
Extended Graphics Array (XGA) is an IBM display standard introduced in 1990. Later, it became the most common appellation of the 1024 × 768 pixels display resolution.

== See also ==
- VGA text mode
- Display resolution standards
- List of color palettes
- List of video connectors
- List of monochrome and RGB color formats
- List of 16-bit computer color palettes
- List of defunct graphics chips and card companies
- Super VGA
- AX-VGA (for Japanese AX architecture computers)
- DOS/V
- DisplayPort and HDMI (which have largely replaced VGA)
