= Planar (computer graphics) =

Method of arranging pixel data

In computer graphics, planar is the method of arranging pixel data into several bitplanes of RAM. Each bit in a bitplane is related to one pixel on the screen. Unlike packed, high color, or true color graphics, the whole dataset for an individual pixel is not in one specific location in RAM, but spread across the bitplanes that make up the display. Planar arrangement determines how pixel data is laid out in memory, not how the data for a pixel is interpreted; pixel data in a planar arrangement could encode either indexed or direct color.

This scheme originated in the early days of computer graphics. The memory chips of this era can not supply data fast enough on their own to generate a picture on a TV screen or monitor from a large framebuffer. By splitting the data up into multiple planes, each plane can be stored on a separate memory chip. These chips can then be read in parallel at a slower rate, allowing graphical display on modest hardware, like game consoles of the third and fourth generations and home computers of the 80s. The EGA video adapter on early IBM PC computers uses planar arrangement in color graphical modes for this reason. The later VGA includes one non-planar mode which sacrifices memory efficiency for more convenient access.

== Hardware with planar graphics ==
Game consoles with a planar display organization include Sega´s Master System and Game Gear, Nintendo´s NES / SNES, and the PC Engine.

The Slovak PP 01 includes a 24KB plane-based 8-colour graphics mode with a resolution of 256x256 pixels. The 16-bit Atari ST and Amiga platforms from the 80s and 90s were exclusively based on a planar graphics configuration alongside a powerful blitter. Amiga's OCS graphics chipset works with 5 bitplanes which allows 2^5=32 colors per pixel, while later models with the AGA chipset can handle eight bitplanes (2^8=256 colors).

For the Sinclair (Amstrad) ZX Spectrum computer family and compatible systems, a graphics expansion named HGFX was developed in 2019. In 2022 it was implemented in FPGA-based hardware. The HGFX enables a memory organization that is compatible with the original ZX Spectrum system while taking up only 6144 bytes of the original video RAM. In addition, it provides two video-buffers, 256 indexed colours, a truecolour palette, and an HDMI output. The HGFX works with eight bitplanes. Currently it is implemented as part of MB03+ Ultimate interface and eLeMeNt ZX computer.

Combining four one-bit planes into a final "four bits per pixel" (16-color) image

== Examples ==
On a chunky display with 4-bits-per-pixel and a RGBI palette, each byte represents two pixels, with 16 different colors available for each pixel. Four consecutive pixels are stored in two consecutive bytes as follows:

Byte index	0		1	
Byte value (decimal)	1		35	
Byte value (hexadecimal)	0x01		0x23	
Nibble value (binary)	0000	0001	0010	0011
Nibble value (decimal)	0	1	2	3
Resulting pixel	Black	Blue	Green	Cyan

Whereas a planar scheme could use 2 bitplanes, providing for a 4 color display. Eight pixels would be stored as 2 bytes non-contiguously in memory:

Byte index	0								Byte value	
Bit index	0	1	2	3	4	5	6	7	hexadecimal	decimal
Plane 0	0	1	0	1	0	0	0	0	0x50	80
Plane 1	0	0	1	1	0	0	0	0	0x30	48
Resulting pixel	0	1	2	3	0	0	0	0		

In the planar example, 2 bytes represent 8 pixels with 4 available colors, where the packed pixel example uses 2 bytes to represent fewer pixels but with more colors. Adding planes will increase the number of colors available at the cost of requiring more memory. For example, using 4 planes makes 2^{4}=16 colors available, but it would then take 4 bytes to represent 8 pixels (making it equivalent in terms of memory usage and available colors to the packed arrangement example).

== Advantages and disadvantages ==
Planar arrangements offer space and time efficiencies over packed arrangements at bit depths that are not powers of 2. As an example, consider 3 bpp, allowing 8 colors. With planar arrangements, this simply requires 3 planes. With packed arrangements, supporting exactly 3 bpp would require either allowing pixels to cross byte boundaries (incurring time costs due to complications with addressing and unpacking pixels) or padding (incurring space costs, as each byte would store 2 pixels and have 2 unused bits); historically, this is one reason (though not necessarily the main one) packed pixels used bit depths that fit evenly into bytes.

Planar arrangements allow for faster bit depth switching: planes are added or discarded and (if colors are indexed) the palette is extended or truncated. Consequently, support for higher bit depths can be added with little to no impact on older software. Ease of bit depth switching also allow elements with different bit depths to be easily used together.

A disadvantage of planar arrangements is that more RAM address cycles are needed for scrolling and animations.

== See also ==
- Packed pixel
- Amiga graphics chipset roadmap
