= List of color palettes =

The following is a list that contains color palettes for notable computer graphics, terminals and video game consoles.

Only a simulated image using a palette and its name are given. Main articles are linked from the name of each palette, test charts, sample colours, simulated images, and further technical details (including references).

During older eras of computing, manufacturers developed many different display systems often in a competitive, non-collaborative basis (with a few exceptions in the VESA consortium), creating many proprietary, non-standard different instances of display hardware. Often, as with early personal and home computers, a given machine employed its unique display subsystem, also with its unique color palette. Furthermore, software developers had made use of the color abilities of distinct display systems in many different ways. The result is that there is no single common standard nomenclature or classification taxonomy which can encompass every computer color palette.

In order to organize the material, color palettes have been grouped following certain criteria. First, generic monochrome and full RGB repertories common to various computer display systems are listed. Then, usual color repertories used for display systems that employ indexed color techniques. And finally, specific manufacturers' color palettes implemented in many representative early personal computers and video game consoles of various brands.

The list for personal computer palettes is split into two categories: 8-bit and 16-bit machines. This is not intended as a true strict categorization of such machines, because mixed architectures also exist (16-bit processors with an 8-bit data bus or 32-bit processors with a 16-bit data bus, among others). The distinction is based more on broad 8-bit and 16-bit computer ages or generations (around 1975–1985 and 1985–1995, respectively) and their associated state of the art in color display capabilities.

The following is the common color test chart and sample image used to render each palette in this list:

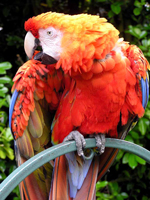

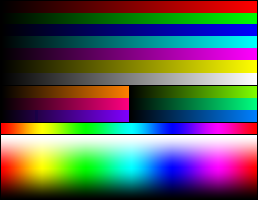

See further details in the summary paragraph of the corresponding article.

== List of monochrome and RGB palettes ==
In this article, the term monochrome palette means a set of intensities for a monochrome display, and the term RGB palette is defined as the complete set of combinations a given RGB display can offer by mixing all the possible intensities of the red, green, and blue primaries available in its hardware.

These are generic complete repertories of colors to produce black and white and RGB color pictures by the display hardware, not necessarily the total number of such colors that can be simultaneously displayed in a given text or graphic mode of any machine. RGB is the most common method to produce colors for displays; so these complete RGB color repertories have every possible combination of R-G-B triplets within any given maximum number of levels per component.

For specific hardware and different methods to produce colors than RGB, see the List of computer hardware palettes and the List of video game consoles sections.

For various software arrangements and sorts of colors, including other possible full RGB arrangements within 8-bit depth displays, see the List of software palettes section.

=== Monochrome palettes ===
These palettes only have shades of gray.

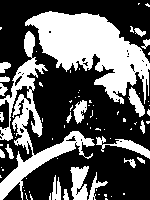
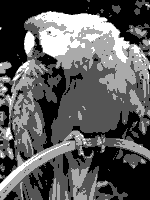
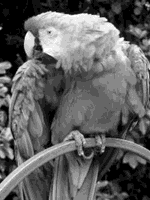
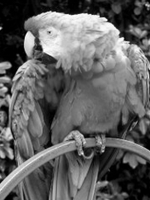
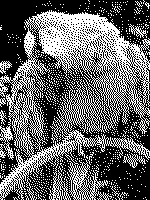
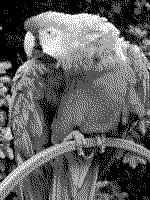
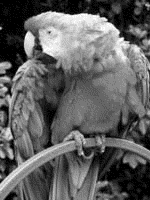
| Bits | Monochrome (1-bit) black and white | 2-bit grayscale 2^{2} = 4 levels of gray | 4-bit grayscale 2^{4} = 16 levels of gray | 8-bit grayscale 2^{8} = 256 levels of gray |
| No dithering |
| Floyd–Steinberg dithering |

=== Dichrome palettes ===
Each permuted pair of red, green, and blue (16-bit color palette, with 65,536 colors). For example, "additive red green" has zero blue and "subtractive red green" has full blue.

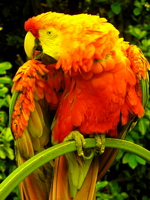
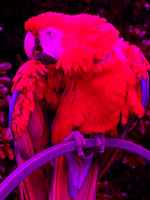
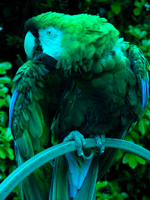
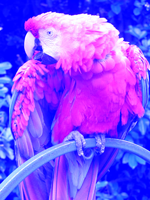
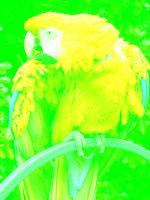
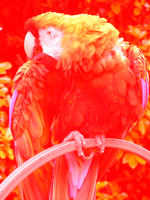
| Colors | 16-bit Red Green | 16-bit Red Blue | 16-bit Green Blue |
| Additive |
| Subtractive |

=== Regular RGB palettes ===
These full RGB palettes employ the same number of bits to store the relative intensity for the red, green and blue components of every image's pixel color. Thus, they have the same number of levels per channel and the total number of possible colors is always the cube of a power of two. It should be understood that 'when developed' many of these formats were directly related to the size of some host computers 'natural word length' in bytes—the amount of memory in bits held by a single memory address such that the CPU can grab or put it in one operation.

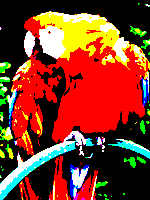
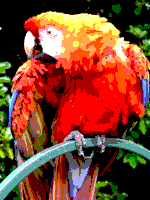
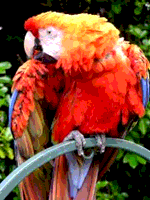
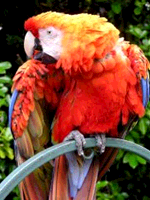
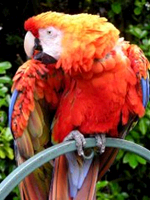
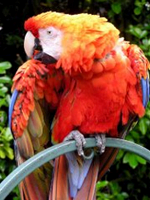
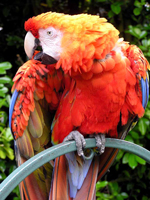
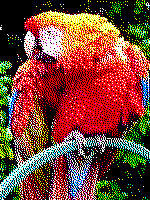
| Bits | 3-bit RGB; 2^{1×3} = 8 colors | 6-bit RGB; 2^{2×3} = 64 colors | 9-bit RGB; 2^{3×3} = 512 colors | 12-bit RGB; 2^{4×3} = 4,096 colors | 15-bit RGB; 2^{5×3} = 32,768 colors | 18-bit RGB; 2^{6×3} = 262,144 colors | 24-bit RGB; 2^{8×3} = 16,777,216 colors |
| no dithering |
| Floyd-Steinberg dithering |
| Color cube |

=== Non-regular RGB palettes ===
These are also RGB palettes, in the sense defined above (except for 4-bit RGBI, which has an intensity bit that affects all channels at once), but either they do not have the same number of levels for each primary channel, or the numbers are not powers of two, so are not represented as separate bit fields. All of these have been used in popular personal computers.

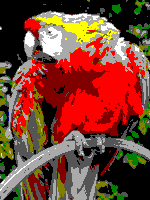
4-bit RGBI; 2^{3}×2 = 16 colors

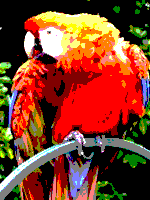
3-level RGB; 3^{3} = 27 colors

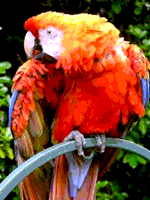
3-3-2 bit RGB; 8×8×4 = 256 colors

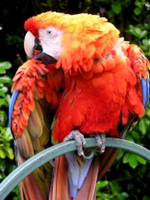
16-bit RGB; 32×64×32 = 65,536 colors (HighColor)

== List of software palettes ==
Systems that use a 4-bit or 8-bit pixel depth can display up to 16 or 256 colors simultaneously. Many personal computers in the later 1980s and early 1990s displayed at most 256 different colors, freely selected by software (either by the user or by a program) from their wider hardware's color palette.

Usual selections of colors in limited subsets (generally 16 or 256) of the full palette includes some RGB level arrangements commonly used with the 8 bpp palettes as master palettes or universal palettes (i.e., palettes for multipurpose uses).

These are some representative software palettes, but any selection can be made in such types of systems.

=== System specific palettes ===
These are selections of colors officially employed as system palettes in some popular operating systems for personal computers that feature 8-bit displays.

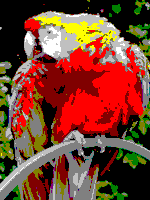
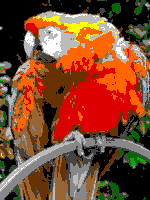
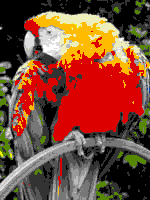
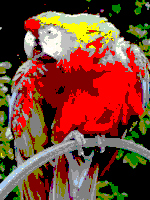
| OS | Windows | Macintosh | RISC OS |
| 16 colors |
| 20 colors |

=== RGB arrangements ===
These are selections of colors based on evenly ordered RGB levels, mainly used as master palettes to display any kind of image within the limitations of the 8-bit pixel depth.

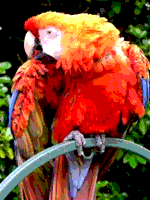
6 level RGB; 6^{3} = 216 colors

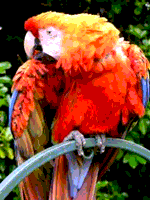
6-8-5 levels RGB; 6×8×5 = 240 colors

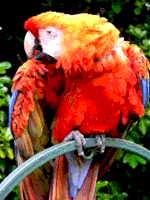
6-7-6 levels RGB; 6×7×6 = 252 colors

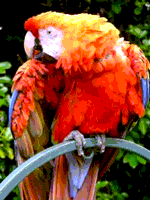
8-8-4 levels RGB; 8×8×4 = 256 colors

=== Other common uses of software palettes ===
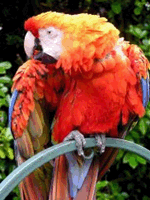
Adaptive palettes Picked colors

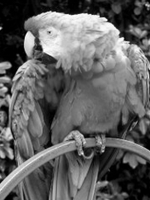
Grayscale palettes Levels of gray

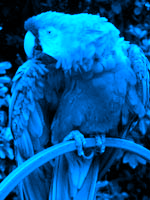
Color gradient palettes Levels of any hue

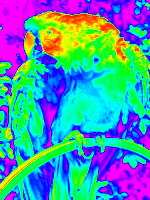
False color palettes Continuous-tone colors

== List of computer hardware palettes ==
In old personal computers and terminals that offered color displays, some color palettes were chosen algorithmically to provide the most diverse set of colors for a given palette size, and others were chosen to assure the availability of certain colors. In many early home computers, especially when the palette choices were determined at the hardware level by resistor combinations, the palette was determined by the manufacturer.

Many early models output composite video colors. When seen on TV devices, the perception of the colors may not correspond with the value levels for the color values employed (most noticeable with NTSC TV color system).

For current RGB display systems for PCs (Super VGA, etc.), see the 16-bit RGB and 24-bit RGB for High Color (thousands) and True Color (millions of colors) modes.

For video game consoles, see the List of video game consoles section.

For every model, their main different graphical color modes are listed based exclusively in the way they handle colors on screen, not all their different screen modes.

The list is organized roughly historically by video hardware, not by branch. They are listed according to the original model of each system, which means that extended versions, clones, and compatibles also support the original palette.

=== Terminals and 8-bit machines ===
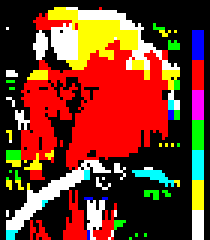
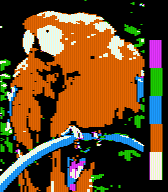
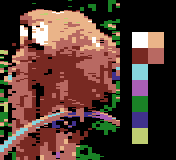
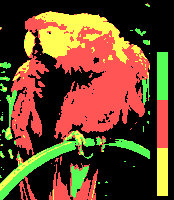
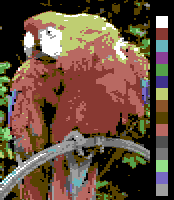
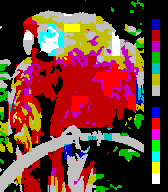
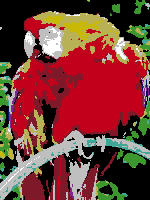
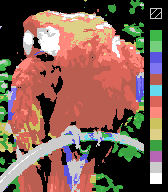
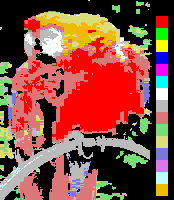
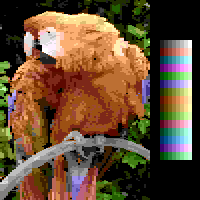
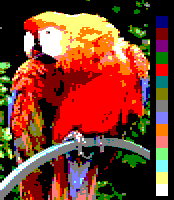
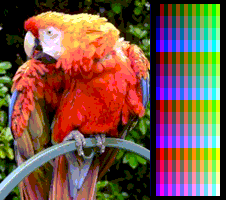
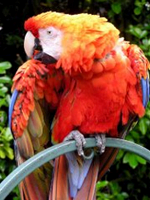
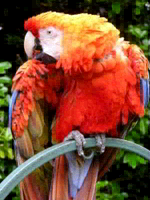
| Teletext (1976); 2×3 cell graphic block characters on a 40×25 character page. 2 colors per block, chosen from 8 primary colors (1 bit each of red, green, and blue). The first row is reserved for a page header and attributes are set with control codes which each occupy one character position giving a maximum resolution of 78×72. |
| Apple II (1977) "Low" (text block) 16-color, "high resolution" (140x192 bitmap) 6-color and "double high" 16-color (NTSC artifact based; actually 280×192 monochrome) graphic modes. |
| VIC-20 (1980); 200 definable characters of 8×16 pixels each, 8 or 10 color palette modes with 2 colors per character cell. |
| CGA for IBM-PC (1981); 16-color text mode (unofficially adjustable to give a 160×100 16-color bitmap mode), 4 color medium and monochrome high resolution graphic modes; medium resolution modes select from six preset palettes (four official, two undocumented; actually three main palettes in low and high intensity form) for the three "foreground" colors, with a free choice amongst the 8 low intensity colors for the fourth, "background" color. All modes work within the same 16-color master palette (1 bit each of red, green, blue, and intensity/brightness) as text mode. |
| Commodore 64 (1982); Low-resolution "Multicolor" (4 colors per sprite or character cell) and medium resolution (2 color per sprite/cell) graphic modes, choosing from 16-color master palette. |
| ZX Spectrum (1982); Bitmapped display with 15 colors (primary hues of RGB with two intensity levels for each except black), assigned on the basis of two "attributes" per 8×8 pixel character cell. Cells also share one intensity level between both "paper" and "ink" colors. |
| Mattel Aquarius (1983); Similar character block and "pixel" arrangement to Teletext, but resolution is a true 80×72 (2×3 pixels on 40×24 grid) and master palette is expanded to 16 colors (1 bit each of red, green, blue, brightness). |
| MSX systems (1983) "Screen 2" and "Screen 3" 15-color graphic modes. |
| Thomson MO5 (1984); Fixed 16-color palette (1 bit each of red, green, blue, and brightness, with bright white replaced by orange), with 2 colors per block on an 8×1 pixel attribute grid. |
| Commodore Plus/4 (1984); Multicolor and High resolution 16-color graphic modes, from 121-color master palette (black and 15 hues by 8 luminosity levels). |
| Amstrad CPC (1984); Low 16-, medium 4- and high resolution 2-color graphic modes (160, 320 and 640 × 200 pixels), from 27-color master palette (3 levels for each of red, green and blue). |
| MSX2 systems (1985) "Screen 8" 256-color graphic modes (3 bits each of red and green, 2 bits for blue). |
| Fujitsu FM-77 AV 40 (1986); Low resolution 262,144-color and high resolution 8-color graphic modes, from 262,144-color palette (6 bits for each of red, green, and blue). |
| MSX2+ systems (1988) "Screen 10&11" 12,499-color YJK+YAE and "Screen 12" 19,268-color YJK graphic modes |

=== 16-bit machines ===
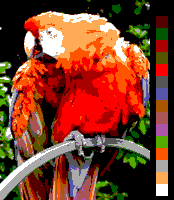
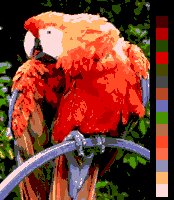
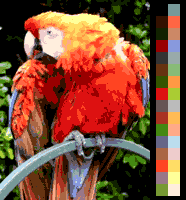
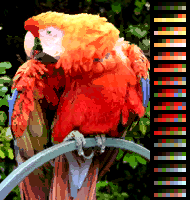
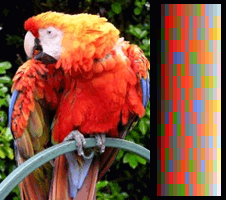
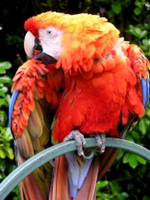
| EGA for IBM PC/AT (1984); Medium and high resolution 16-color graphic modes, out of 64 (2 bits for each of red, green, and blue). |
| Atari ST (1985); Low 16-, medium 4-color and high resolution monochrome modes, out of 512 (3 bits for each of red, green, and blue) or 4096 (4 bits each) on STe. |
| Commodore Amiga OCS (1985); 2-, 4-, 8-, 16- and 32-color standard graphic modes, EHB 64-color and HAM 4096-color enhanced modes; 2 to 64 color modes pick from a 4096-color master palette (4 bits for each of red, green, and blue), with 64 color mode constructed from 32 normally chosen colors plus a second set of 32 fixed at half the intensity of the first. HAM mode restricted by only being able to change one color channel (red, green or blue) per pixel. |
| Apple IIgs (1986); Super High Res 4-, 8-, 16- and 256-color graphic modes, from 4096 (4 bits of each of red, green, and blue), with some palette choice restrictions in 80-column modes. |
| MCGA and VGA for IBM PC/AT (1987); Medium 256- and high resolution 16-color graphic modes, from 262,144 (6 bits of each of red, green, and blue). |
| Sharp X68000 (1987); Medium 65,536-color and high resolution 16-color graphic modes, from 65,536. |

=== Video game console palettes ===
Color palettes of some of the most popular video game consoles. The criteria are the same as those of the List of computer hardware palettes section.

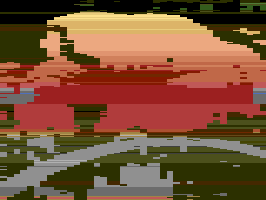
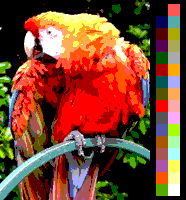
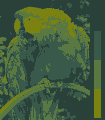
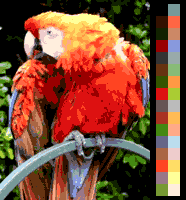
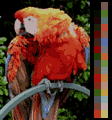
| Atari 2600 (1977); 4 out of 128 colors (16 hues by 8 luminosity levels) on every scanline |
| Famicom/NES (1983); 25 out of 55 usable colors (12 hues by 4 luminosity levels, + 7 greys); 1 background color, four 3-color (plus transparent) tile palettes and four 3-color (plus transparent) sprite palettes. |
| Sega Master System (1985); 32 colors out of 64 (2 bits for each of red, green, and blue) |
| NEC PC-Engine/TurboGrafx-16 (1987); 482 colors out of 512 |
| Sega Mega Drive/Genesis (1988); 61 colors out of 512 (or approximately 1500 including shadow/highlight modes) |
| Nintendo Game Boy (1989); 4 grayscales, rendered as shades of green on the original model's screen (and later, true grayscales, on the Game Boy Pocket). |
| Sega Game Gear (1990); 32 colors out of 4,096 |
| Super Famicom/SNES (1990); 256 out of 32,768 colors (5 bits for each of red, green, and blue) |
| Nintendo Game Boy Color (1998); Type 1 (original Game Boy) cartridges with free choice of various 10-color palettes (built into console and chosen at system start; no example shown), and Type 3 (GBC enhanced or exclusive) cartridges with own 56-color palettes. Arranged as a single background layer with 4 colors and 2 sprite layers of 3 colors plus transparent (Type 1), or eight 4-color background palettes with eight 3-color sprite layers (Type 3), chosen from a 32,768-color master palette. |
| Nintendo Game Boy Advance/SP/Micro (2001); Type 1 (original Game Boy), Type 3 (Game Boy Color) 56-color and Type 4 (GBA) 32,768-color cartridges (limited to 512 simultaneous colors on-screen in some display modes) |

== See also ==
- List of monochrome and RGB color formats
- List of software palettes
- List of 8-bit computer hardware palettes
- List of 16-bit computer hardware palettes
- List of video game console palettes
- Palette (computing)
- Indexed color
- List of colors (compact)
- Web colors
- X11 color names
- Color depth
- Computer display
- List of home computers by video hardware
