= List of video game console palettes =

List of colors used by video game systems

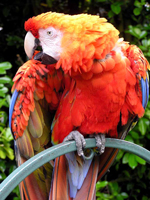
24-bit palette sample image

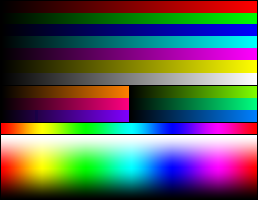
24 bit Palette Color Test Chart

This is a full list of color palettes for notable video game console hardware.

For each unique palette, an image color test chart and sample image (original True color version follows) rendered with that palette (without dithering unless otherwise noted) are given. The test chart shows the full 8 bit, 256 levels of the red, green and blue (RGB) primary colors and cyan, magenta and yellow complementary colors, along with a full 8 bit, 256 levels grayscale. Gradients of full saturation of intermediate colors (orange, yellow-green, green-cyan, blue-cyan, violet, and red-magenta), and a full hue spectrum are also present. Color charts are not gamma corrected.

== Atari ==
=== Atari 2600 ===
The Television Interface Adaptor (TIA) is the custom computer chip that generated graphics for the Atari Video Computer System game console. It generated different YIQ color palettes dependent on the television signal format used.

==== NTSC ====
With the NTSC format, a 128-color palette was available, built based on eight luma values and 15 combinations of I and Q chroma signals (plus I = Q = 0 for a pure grayscale):

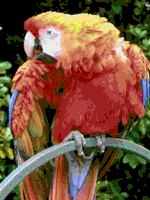

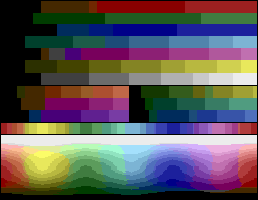

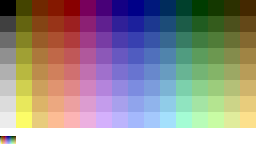

	Hue																	
Luma	Decimal	>	0	1	2	3	4	5	6	7	8	9	10	11	12	13	14	15
Luma	v	Hex	0	1	2	3	4	5	6	7	8	9	A	B	C	D	E	F
Luma	0, 1	0, 1																
Luma	2, 3	2, 3																
Luma	4, 5	4, 5																
Luma	6, 7	6, 7																
Luma	8, 9	8, 9																
Luma	10, 11	A, B																
Luma	12, 13	C, D																
Luma	14, 15	E, F																

The above image assumes there is no limit on the number of colors per scan line. With the system's actual color restrictions (and proper change in aspect ratio), the same image would look very different:

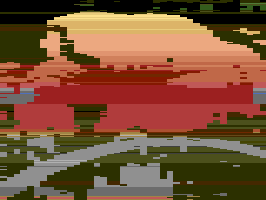

==== PAL ====
With the PAL format, a 104-color palette was available. 128-color entries could still be selected, but due to the different color encoding scheme, 32 color entries results in the same eight shades of gray:

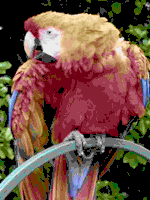

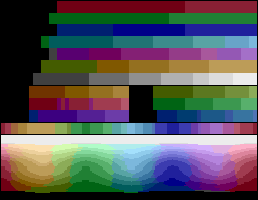

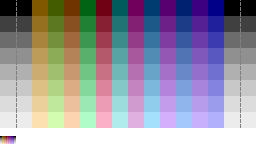

	Hue																	
Luma	Deci.	>	0	1	2	3	4	5	6	7	8	9	10	11	12	13	14	15
Luma	v	Hex.	0	1	2	3	4	5	6	7	8	9	A	B	C	D	E	F
Luma	0, 1	0, 1																
Luma	2, 3	2, 3																
Luma	4, 5	4, 5																
Luma	6, 7	6, 7																
Luma	8, 9	8, 9																
Luma	10, 11	A, B																
Luma	12, 13	C, D																
Luma	14, 15	E, F																

The above image assumes there is no limit on the number of colors per scanline. With the system's actual color restrictions (and proper change in aspect ratio), the same image would look very different:

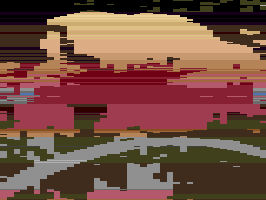

==== SECAM ====
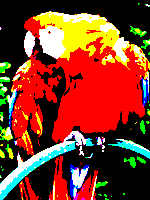

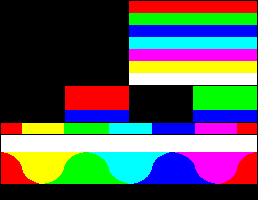

The SECAM palette was reduced to a simple 3-bit RGB, containing only 8 colors (black, blue, red, magenta, green, cyan, yellow and white) by mapping the luma values:

Decimal	0	1	2	3	4	5	6	7	8	9	10	11	12	13	14	15
Hexadecimal	0	1	2	3	4	5	6	7	8	9	A	B	C	D	E	F
Color																

=== Modern Hardware-Assisted Implementation ===
The MovieCart (by Rob Bairos) is a modern (2022) cartridge that implements sophisticated display techniques that allow more realistic images to be displayed on the Atari 2600. The MovieCart format offers 80 pixels horizontally, and 192 (NTSC) or 242 (PAL, SECAM) scanlines of resolution. Each line effectively has 10 multiplexed sprites displayed in groups of 5 on alternating frames. Each of the sprites can have its own colour. A sophisticated encoding algorithm allows arbitrary images to be displayed using all the colours available on the console, with some limitations related to colour changes. The encoder dithers and optimises colour usage to minimise errors in image reproduction.

Note that the original Atari 2600 hardware is still being used to display these images; the 6507 microprocessor is retrieving colours from memory, and the TIA chip is still producing the video data.

The following images are screen grabs using the Gopher2600 emulator, but increased in brightness to match what the human eye actually sees when viewing on hardware.

==== PAL ====
Resolution: 80 x 242 (128 colours)

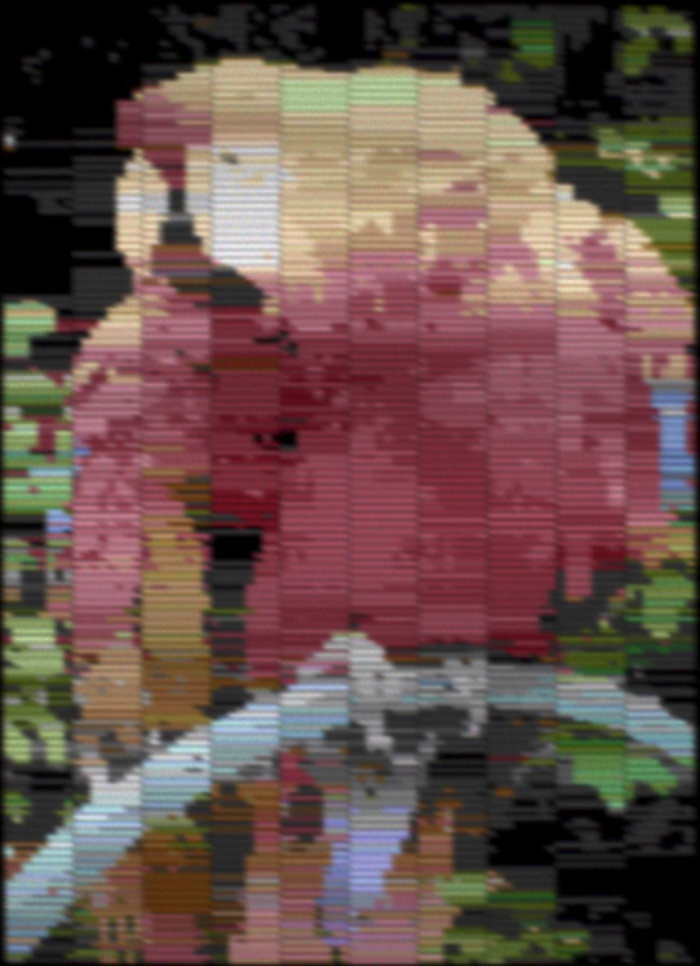
PAL, dithered

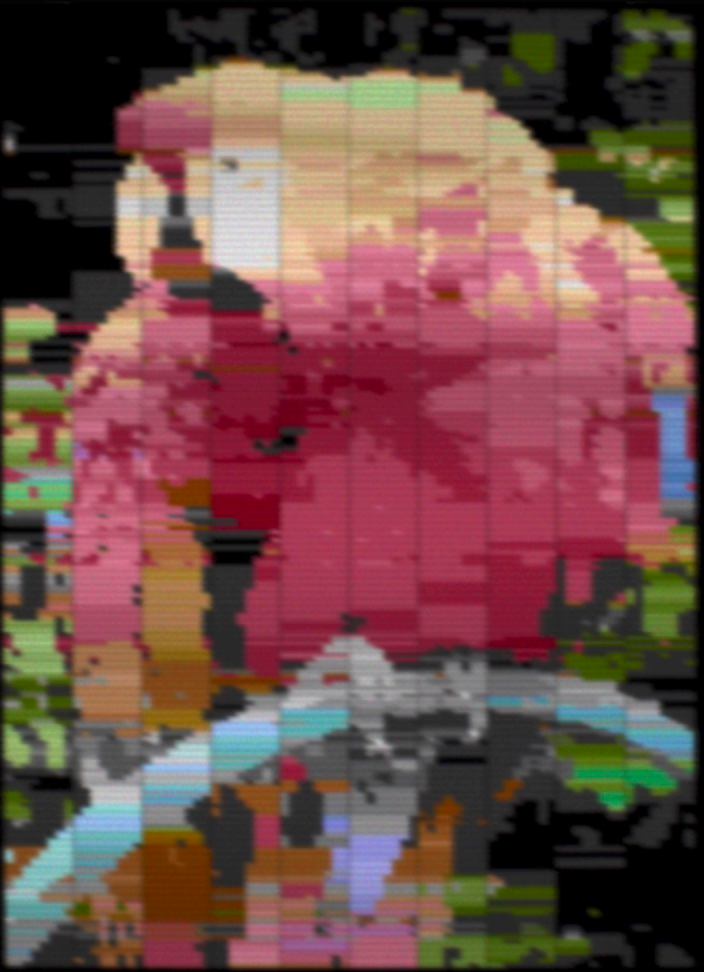
PAL, no dithering

==== NTSC ====
Resolution: 80 x 192 (128 colours)

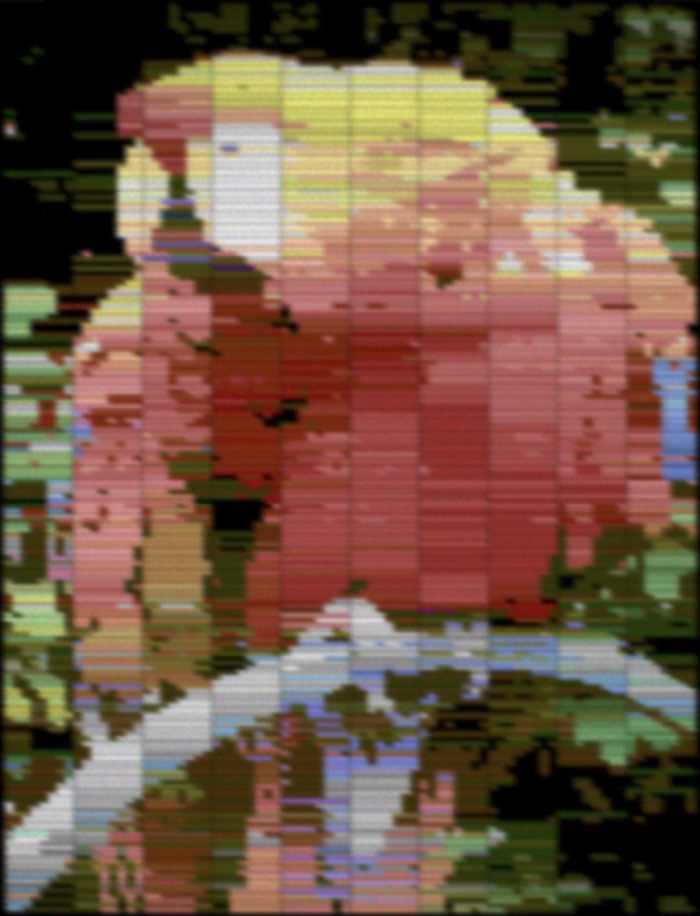
NTSC, dithered

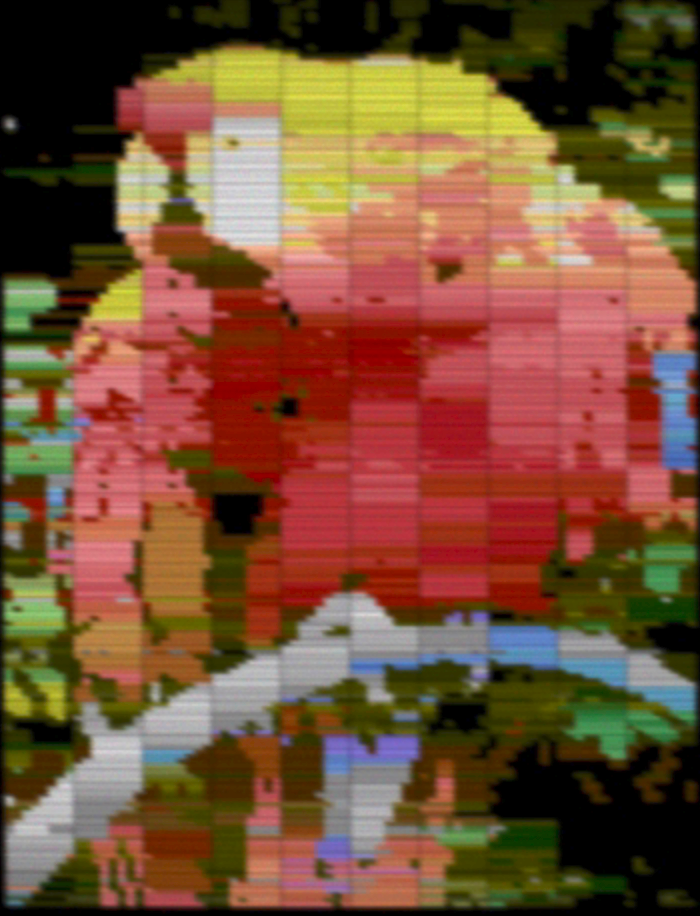
NTSC, no dithering

==== SECAM ====
Resolution: 80 x 242 (8 colours)

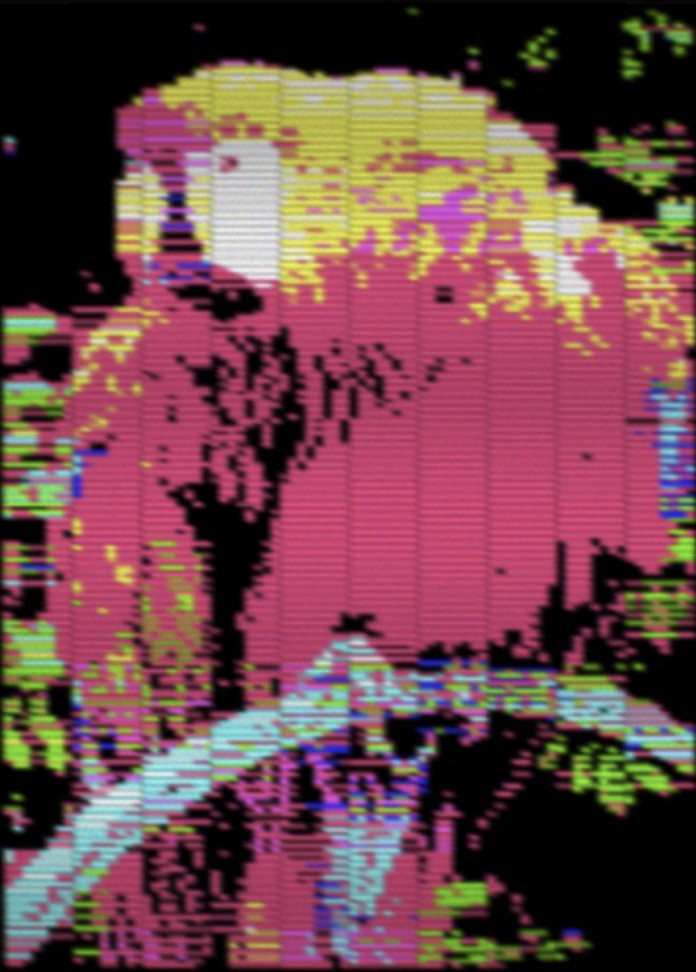
SECAM, dithered

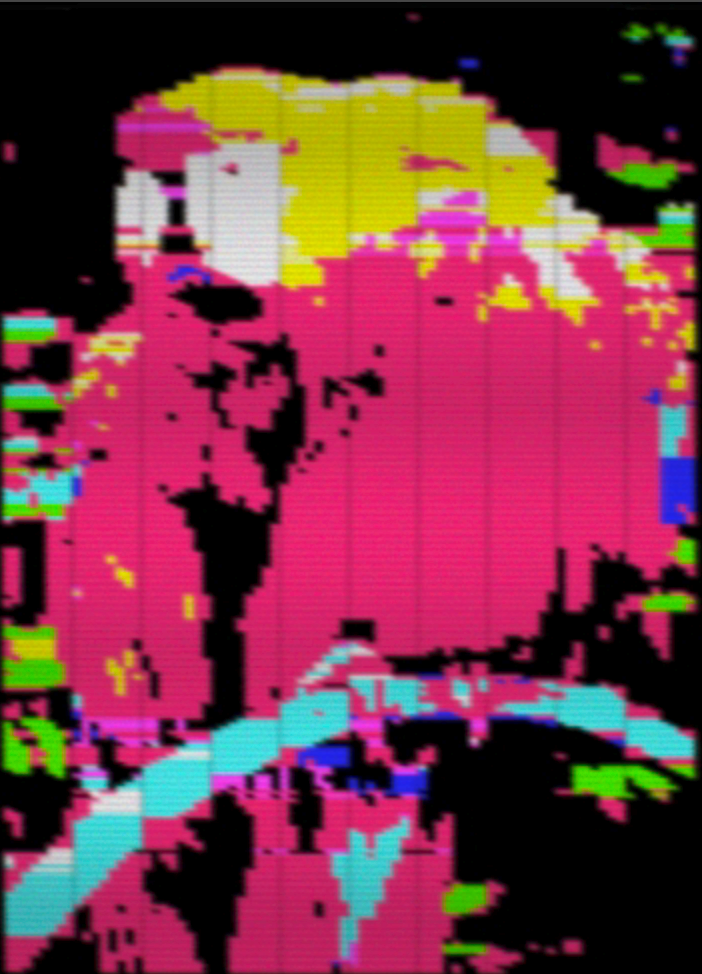
SECAM, no dithering

=== 'rasterBleed' Implementation ===
This recently developed display technique (July 2026) uses time-varying colour and pixel blending. Three frames, each with a single colour per scanline, played in succession at 60Hz. The eye merges the colours to produce quite a stable image.

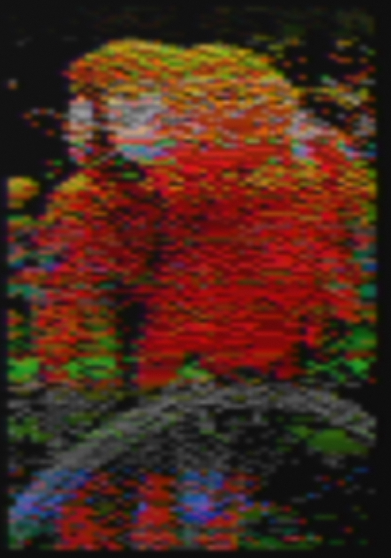
RasterBleed screenshot from Gopher emulator

=== Lynx ===
The Atari Lynx used a 4096-color palette. The video hardware was custom built and designed by Jay Miner and Dave Morse It used two chips, named Mikey and Suzy. Resolution was 160×102 pixels and it was possible to use 16 simultaneous colors per scanline.

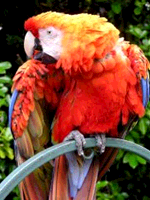

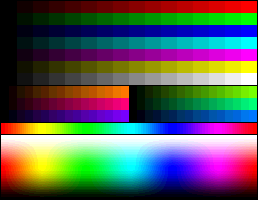

== Nintendo ==
=== NES ===
The Picture Processing Unit (PPU) used in the Nintendo Entertainment System generates color based on a composite video palette.

The 54-colors can be created based on four luma values, twelve combinations of I and Q chroma signals and two series of I = Q = 0 for several pure grays. Memory bits expressing colour are arranged like this: VVHHHH, where V corresponds to I values and H to Q. There are two identical whites, one of the blacks has less-than-zero brightness, and one of the lighter grays is within 2% of another, so sometimes the palette has been reported to have 52 to 55 colors.

In addition to this, it had 3 color emphasis bits which can be used to dim the entire palette by any combination of red, green and blue. This extends the total available colors to 448, but inconveniently divided into 8 variations of the base 56. Because it affects the whole palette at once it may be considered more of a filter effect applied to the image, rather than an increased palette range.

The PPU produces colors outside of the TV color gamut, resulting in some colors being presented differently on different TV systems.

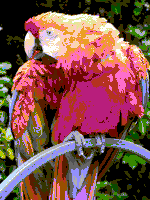

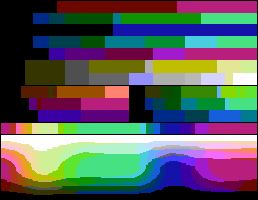

Hex Value	0	1	2	3	4	5	6	7	8	9	A	B	C	D	E	F
0x00																
0x10																
0x20																
0x30																

The NES PPU uses a background palette with up to 13 of these colors at a time, consisting of one common backdrop color and four subpalettes of three colors, chosen from the above set. The PPU's video memory layout allows choosing one subpalette for each 16×16 pixel area of the background. (A special video mode of the MMC5 mapper overrides this, assigning a subpalette to each 8×8-pixel tile.) Sprites have an additional set of four 3-color subpalettes (with color 0 being transparent in each) and every 8×8 or 8×16 pixels can have their own subpalette, allowing for a total of 12 different colors to use for sprites at any given time, or a total of 25 on-screen colors.

Because of the constraints mentioned above, converting a photograph often results in attribute clash at 16×16-pixel boundaries. Conversions with and without dithering follow, using the hex palette 0F160608 0F162720 0F090010 0F0A1910 (the repeated 0F represents black as the common backdrop color).

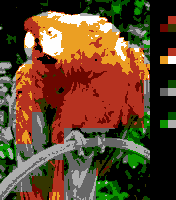
Without dithering

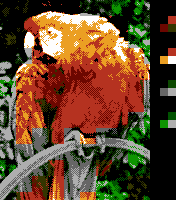
With dithering

=== Game Boy ===
The original Game Boy uses a monochrome 4-shade palette. Because the non-backlit LCD background is greenish, this results in a "greenscale" graphic display, as it is shown in the simulated image (at Game Boy display resolution), below. The Game Boy Pocket uses a monochrome 4-shade palette using actual gray, while the Game Boy Light gives the screen more of a bright blueish tint while its backlight is turned on. However, if its backlight were not on, it would look the same as the Game Boy Pocket.

Original Game Boy	Game Boy Pocket/Light	Game Boy Light (Backlit)

Original Game Boy Hex / Binary	0x0 00	0x1 01	0x2 10	0x3 11
Game Boy Pocket Hex / Binary	0x0 00	0x1 01	0x2 10	0x3 11
Game Boy Light Hex / Binary	0x0 00	0x1 01	0x2 10	0x3 11

=== Super Nintendo Entertainment System ===
The Picture Processing Unit (PPU) used in the Super Nintendo Entertainment System has a 15-bit RGB (32,768 color) palette, with up to 256 simultaneous colors.

However, while the hardware palette can only contain 256 entries, in most display modes the graphics are arranged into between 2 and 4 layers, and these layers can be combined using additive or subtractive color blending. Because these blended colors are calculated by the hardware itself, and do not have to be represented by any of the existing palette entries, the actual number of visible colors onscreen at any one time can be much higher.

The exact number depends on the number of layers, and the combination of colors used by these layers, as well as what blending mode and graphical effects are in use. In theory it can show the entire 32,768 colors, but in practice this is rarely the case for reasons such as memory use. Most games use 256-color mode, with 15-color palettes assigned to 8×8 pixel areas of the background.

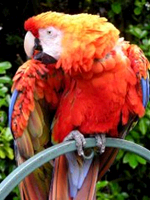
Theoretical 32768-color

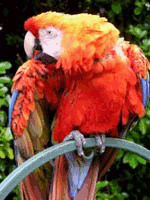
Practical 256-color

=== Game Boy Color ===
The Game Boy Color systems use a 15-bit RGB (32,768 colors) palette.

The specific Game Boy Color game cartridges have 8 background palettes (4 colors each) and 8 sprite palettes (3 colors plus transparent each) for a total of up to 56 colors without the use of special programming techniques. Backgrounds and objects (sprites) are both composed of 8×8-pixel tiles, with each pixel in these tiles being one of four color indizes (palette entries). However, tiles themselves do not reference a certain palette. Instead, the palette is assigned when the tile is used, so the same tile can be displayed with different palettes. Typically sprite palettes share some colors (black, white or others) or some palettes may be unused in a certain frame, so the total colors displayed will usually be less than 56.

As there are only 8 palettes for the 360 to 399 background tiles on screen, many tiles will have to share a palette. For a photographic image, finding tiles that can share a palette is tricky, so no simulated image is currently available.

Though there is a 56 color limit, this in of itself is a palette storage limit and not an actual hardware limitation. As such, the programmer can swap out the palettes every two scanlines. Because of this ability to swap out the palettes, around 2,000 colors can actually appear on screen per frame when programmed like that (using only background palettes).

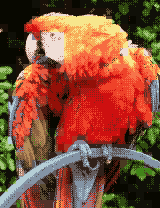
32-background colors, dithered

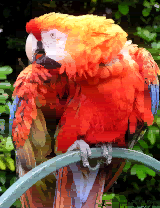
HiColor rendered (1774 colors)

When an older monochrome original Game Boy game cartridge (Type 1) is plugged-in, the Game Boy Color first tries to apply a palette from a hard-coded game list in the device's ROM. If the system does not have a palette stored for a game, it defaults to the "Dark green" palette (see below). The player can also choose one of 12 false color palettes. Type 1 games can have from 4 to 10 colors, four are for the background plane palette and there are two more hardware sprite plane palettes, with three colors plus transparent each. In the hard-coded game list, some games were given a unique palette that cannot be accessed manually. Only these unique palettes have the maximum of 10 different colors. Some homebrew Type 1 games use an adjusted game title to make a GBC think they were a certain commercial game that defaults to their desired palette (usually the "Gray" one used by X).

The following shows the palettes (background plus both sprite planes) and the combination of controls used (the names are taken from the Game Boy Color user's manual; the colors are simulated):

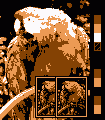
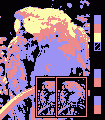
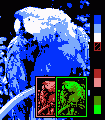
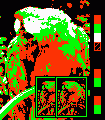
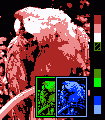
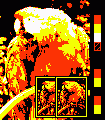
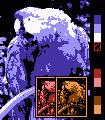
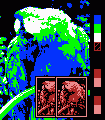
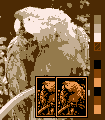
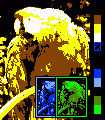
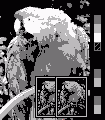
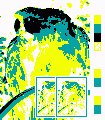
Combo	Up	Down	Left	Right
	Brown	Pale yellow	Blue	Green
A	Red	Orange	Dark blue	Dark green
B	Dark brown	Yellow	Gray	Reverse

Game Boy color palette mapping
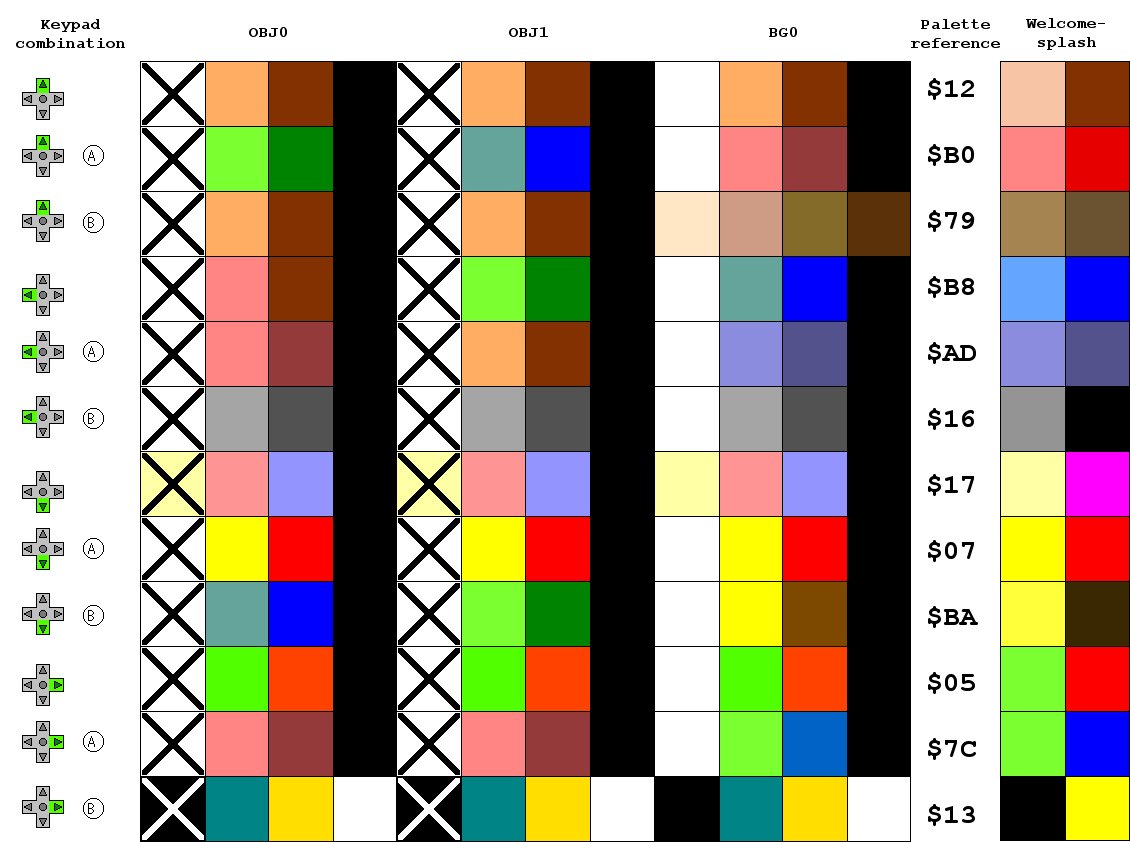

=== Game Boy Advance ===
The Game Boy Advance/Advance SP/Micro systems also uses a 15-bit RGB palette, and along with the original and Color modes, they have also a specific Highcolor 32,768 colors mode. The LCDs of the Micro and some models of the SP are backlit, giving brighter images.

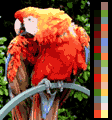
Compatible mode

32,768-color

=== Nintendo DS ===
The Nintendo DS has a display capable of using 18-bit RGB color palette, making a total of 262,144 possible colors; of these, 32,767 simultaneous colors can be displayed at once. The 18-bit color palette is only available in 3D video mode or in 2D modes when blending effects are used. The other video modes are similar to the GBA, but feature some enhancements. For example, the DS provides a number of 16 extended 256 color palettes for backgrounds as well as sprites on each of the two screens, allowing for a total of 8192 colors per frame (the practical number may be less due to some of the colors being considered transparent). The handheld's successor, Nintendo DS Lite, has brighter screens which makes some old GBA and NDS titles look different.

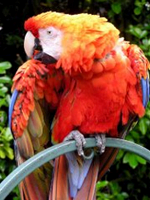

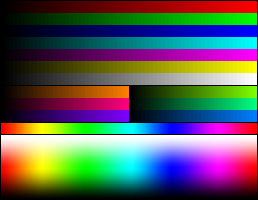

=== Nintendo 3DS ===
The Nintendo 3DS has a 24-bit RGB palette.

== Sega ==
=== Master System ===
The Master System had a 6-bit RGB palette (64 colors), with 32 colors on-screen at once. It is possible to display all 64 colors at once using raster effects (line interrupts). The console used a proprietary chip called Video Display Processor (VDP) with the same internal design as the Texas Instruments TMS9918 (used in the SG-1000), although with enhanced features such as extra colors.

There are only 512 different 8×8 tile patterns to cover the screen though, when 768 would be required for a complete 256×192 screen. This means that at least 1/3 of the tiles will have to be repeated. To help maximize tile reuse, they can be flipped either vertically or horizontally. The 64 sprites of 8×16 pixels can also be used to help to cover the screen (max 8 per scanline).

Because of the constraints mentioned above, there are no current accurate simulated screen images available for the Sega Master System.

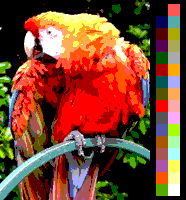

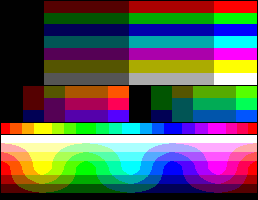

0x00	0x01	0x02	0x03	0x04	0x05	0x06	0x07	0x08	0x09	0x0A	0x0B	0x0C	0x0D	0x0E	0x0F
0x10	0x11	0x12	0x13	0x14	0x15	0x16	0x17	0x18	0x19	0x1A	0x1B	0x1C	0x1D	0x1E	0x1F
0x20	0x21	0x22	0x23	0x24	0x25	0x26	0x27	0x28	0x29	0x2A	0x2B	0x2C	0x2D	0x2E	0x2F
0x30	0x31	0x32	0x33	0x34	0x35	0x36	0x37	0x38	0x39	0x3A	0x3B	0x3C	0x3D	0x3E	0x3F

=== Mega Drive/Genesis and Pico ===
The Mega Drive/Genesis and Pico used the Sega 315-5313 (Yamaha YM7101) Video Display Processor, providing a 9-bit RGB palette (512 colors, up to approximately 1500 including shadow and highlight mode) with up to 61 colors on-screen at once without raster effects (4 palette lines of 16 colors each, palette indices $x0 are definable but considered as transparent, and can only be used as the background color).

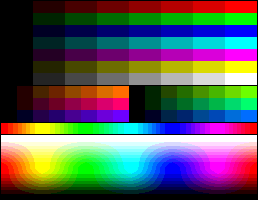

=== Game Gear ===
The Game Gear had a 12-bit RGB palette (4096 colors), with 32 colors on-screen at once.

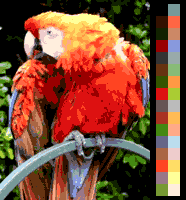

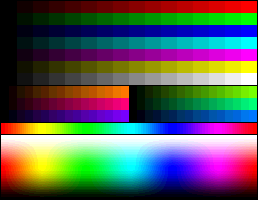

=== 32X ===
The Sega 32X had a 15-bit RGB palette (32,768 colors). The 32X offered 3 display modes. Packed pixel and run length modes allowed for 256 colors at a given time, 317 including the Genesis' palette as the 32X video is overlaid on top of it. And direct color mode allowing for all 32768 colors to display at once with the caveat of reducing the console's vertical resolution to 204 pixels.

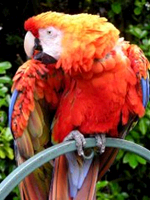

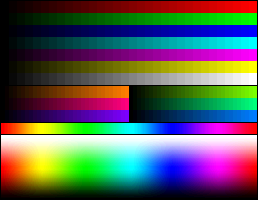

== NEC ==
=== TurboGrafx-16 ===
The TurboGrafx-16 used a 9-bit RGB palette consisting of 512 colors with 482 colors on-screen at once (16 background palettes of 16 colors each, with at least 1 common color among all background palettes, and 16 sprite palettes of 15 colors each, plus transparent which is visible as the overscan area).

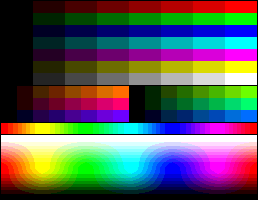

== Fairchild ==
=== Channel F ===
The Fairchild Channel F is able to use one plane of graphics and one of four background colors per line, with three plot colors to choose from (red, green, and blue) that turned into white if the background is set to black, at a resolution of 128 × 64, with approximately 102 × 58 pixels visible. In total there are 8 possible colors.

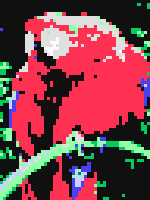

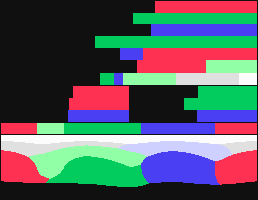

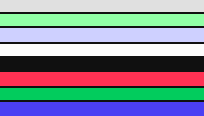

== Mattel Electronics ==
=== Intellivision ===
The Intellivision graphics are powered by the Standard Television Interface Chip (STIC). The chip generates a sixteen color palette, based on four bit input and divided into two sets.

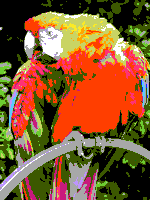

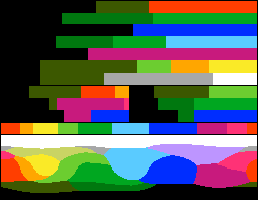

AY-3-8900 color palette
Color Set	Color	Bits	Y	I	Q
Primary	Black	0000	0.000	0.000	0.000
Primary	Blue	0001	0.330	-0.733	+0.660
Primary	Red	0010	0.523	+0.666	+0.200
Primary	Tan	0011	0.715	+0.266	-0.133
Primary	Dark Green	0100	0.413	-0.133	-0.600
Primary	Green	0101	0.577	-0.200	-0.533
Primary	Yellow	0110	0.853	+0.533	-0.333
Primary	White	0111	1.000	0.000	0.000
Pastel	Gray	1000	0.550	0.000	0.000
Pastel	Cyan	1001	0.660	-0.533	-0.266
Pastel	Orange	1010	0.687	+0.533	-0.066
Pastel	Brown	1011	0.330	+0.266	-0.266
Pastel	Magenta	1100	0.550	+0.400	+0.667
Pastel	Light Blue	1101	0.660	-0.400	+0.400
Pastel	Yellow-Green	1110	0.687	+0.066	-0.533
Pastel	Purple	1111	0.440	+0.133	+0.533

== Epoch ==
=== Super Cassette Vision ===
The Super Cassette Vision, equipped with an EPOCH TV-1 video processor, uses a 16-color palette. Colors are generated based on 4-bits, controlling RGB outputs with three levels: 0, 75 and 100%

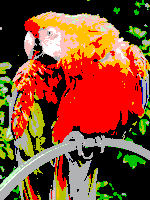

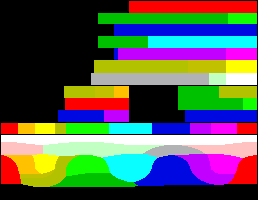

Super Cassette Vision color palette
Number	Color	Levels (%)		
Number	Color	R	G	B
1	Dark Blue	0	0	75
2	Black	0	0	0
3	Blue	0	0	100
4	Purple	75	0	100
5	Green	0	100	0
6	Light Green	75	100	75
7	Cyan	0	100	100
8	Dark Green	0	75	0
9	Red	100	0	0
10	Orange	100	75	0
11	Magenta	100	0	100
12	Light Red	100	75	75
13	Yellow	100	100	0
14	Dark Yellow	75	75	0
15	Gray	75	75	75
16	White	100	100	100

== Magnavox / Philips ==
=== Odyssey 2 / Videopac G7000 ===
The Magnavox Odyssey 2 is equipped with an Intel 8244 (NTSC) or 8245 (PAL) custom IC, and uses a 4-bit RGBI color palette. This translates on screen into eight basic colors with a half-brightness variation.

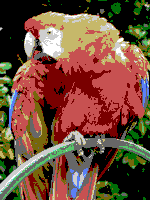

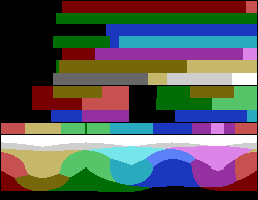

Internally, color register $A3 bits 0 to 2 define Grid color, bits 3 to 5 define Background color, bit 6 defines Grid luminance (0=dim/1=bright), with bit 7 being unused. The following table exemplifies this arrangement:

Color register $A3 organization
	Grid Luminance	Background Color			Grid Color		
Bit	6	5	4	3	2	1	0

There are color usage limitations for sprites and backgrounds, shown in the following table.

Magnavox Odyssey 2 color usage limitations
	Character / Sprite Color	Grid Colors	
	Character / Sprite Color	Dark Back	Light Back
0	Dark Grey	Black	Black
1	Red	Dark Blue	Blue
2	Green	Dark Green	Green
3	Orange	Light Green	Light Green
4	Blue	Red	Red
5	Violet	Violet	Violet
6	Light Gray	Orange	Orange
7	White	Light Gray	Light Gray

=== CD-i ===
The Green Book specifies that encoded image formats used by CD-i software can be decoded to a 15-bit RGB (32,768 color) format, with up to 256 colors.

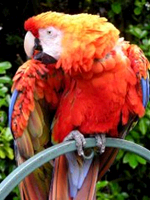

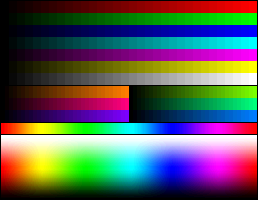

== See also ==
- Color depth
- Computer monitor
- Indexed color
- List of 8-bit computer hardware palettes
- List of 16-bit computer hardware palettes
- List of color palettes
- List of home computers by video hardware
- List of monochrome and RGB color formats
- List of software palettes
- Palette (computing)
