= List of 16-bit computer color palettes =

This is a list of notable RGB hardware color palettes used on 16-bit computers, which were primarily manufactured from 1985 to 1995. Due to mixed-bit architectures, the n-bit distinction is not always a strict categorization.

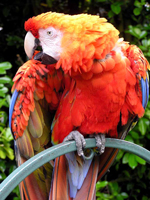
Sample image

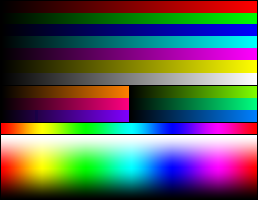
Color test chart

12-bit, 4096-color palette

15-bit, 32768-color palette

12-bit, 4096-color palette
0x00		0x01		0x02		0x03		0x04		0x05		0x06		0x07		0x08		0x09		0x0A		0x0B		0x0C		0x0D		0x0E		0x0F	
15-bit, 32768-color palette
0x 00	0x 01	0x 02	0x 03	0x 04	0x 05	0x 06	0x 07	0x 08	0x 09	0x 0A	0x 0B	0x 0C	0x 0D	0x 0E	0x 0F	0x 10	0x 11	0x 12	0x 13	0x 14	0x 15	0x 16	0x 17	0x 18	0x 19	0x 1A	0x 1B	0x 1C	0x 1D	0x 1E	0x 1F

== Atari ==
=== ST series ===
The Atari ST series has a digital-to-analog converter with 3-bits (eight levels) per RGB channel, featuring a 9-bit RGB palette (512 colors). Depending on the (proprietary) monitor type attached, it displays either 320×200 with 16-colors or 640×200 with 4-colors with a color monitor (or TV), or the high resolution 640×400 black and white mode with a monochrome monitor.

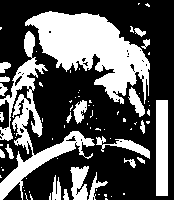
2 colors

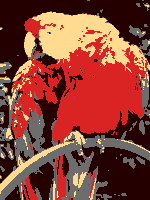
4 colors

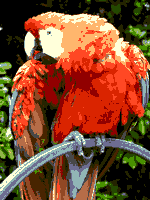
16 colors

9-bit, 512-color palette

2-color (monochrome) mode is either black on white or white on black.

The STE, Mega STE and TT have a digital-to-analog converter with 4-bits (sixteen levels) per RGB channel, featuring a 12-bit RGB palette (4096 colors) similar to the Commodore Amiga.

=== TT 030 ===
The Atari TT also has 4-bits per RGB channel, for a 12-bit RGB palette (4096 colors) and in addition to the ST's modes, can use any 2 colors in 640x400 1 bit per pixel mode and 16 colours at 640x480. It also has a 320x480 256 color mode and a 1280x960 monochrome mode. The 256 color mode can either use a palette of colors picked from the 4096, or 256 shades of grey.

=== Falcon 030 ===
The Atari Falcon 030 uses a 6-bits per channel, 64 level digital-to-analog converter to give an 18-bit RGB palette (262,144 colors), from which can be selected any 2, 4, 16, or 256 at a time. It also has a 16-bit (RGB565) high-color mode able to display any of 65536 colors, though this is somewhat performance limiting.

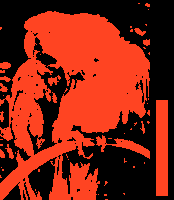
2 colors

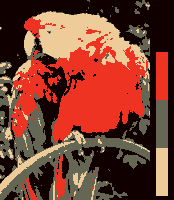
4 colors

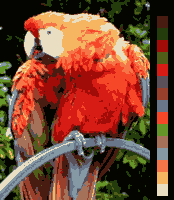
16 colors

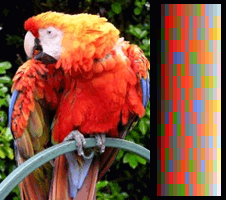
256 colors

== Commodore ==
=== Amiga OCS ===
The Original Chip Set (OCS) of the Commodore Amiga features a 12-bit RGB, 4,096-color palette. As the Amiga Copper programmable graphics coprocessor is capable of changing color lookup table entries on the fly during display, in practice the number of distinct colors visible on-screen may exceed static color lookup table sizes documented here.

==== 5-bit ====
The picture is divided in a series of bit planes, between 1 and 6 for horizontal resolutions of 320 (or up to 384 with overscan), and between 1 and 4 for horizontal resolutions of 640 (or up to 768 with overscan). For either horizontal resolution, the vertical resolution is either 200 (or up to 240 with overscan), or 400 (or up to 480 with overscan) if interlaced, for NTSC-compatible video modes; or 256 (or up to 288 with overscan), or 512 (or up to 576 with overscan) if interlaced, for PAL-compatible video modes. The color lookup table has up to 32 entries. So the different indexed color modes are from 1 to 5 bits pixel depth, 2-, 4-, 8-, 16- or 32-color out of 4,096.

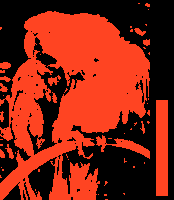
2 colors

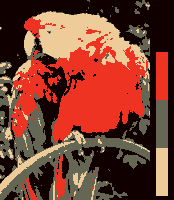
4 colors

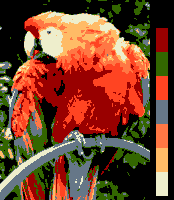
8 colors

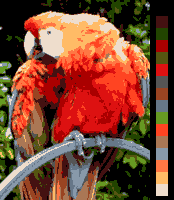
16 colors

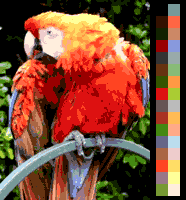
32 colors

==== 6-bit ====
When the sixth bit-plane is used, two extra color modes can be set: Extra Half-Brite (EHB) and Hold-And-Modify (HAM).

In the EHB mode, when the sixth bit is set to on for any given pixel, the display hardware halves the brightness of said pixel. This allows the Amiga to display 64 colors instead of the standard 32, with the caveat being that the 32 extra colors cannot be arbitrarily selected, and must be darker versions of those already being displayed on screen

In the HAM mode, the two higher bits of the 6-bits pixels are used as a four state command. Three of the states changes only the red, green or blue component of the pixel respect of the precedent in the scan line, and hold the other two RGB components. The new value for the modified color component is in the four lower bits. The remaining command state forces the pixel value to be one of the 16 first values of the palette, whose indice is in the four lower bits of the pixel. So it is very important to have a well selected palette, or the color will spread easily among consecutive pixels in the scan line of the image. This mode can display all of the 4,096 colors simultaneously.

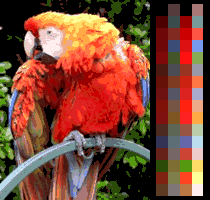
64 colors (EHB mode)

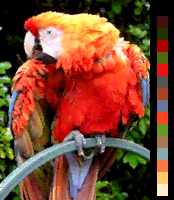
4096 colors (HAM mode)

=== Amiga ECS ===
Amigas with the newer ECS chipset have the same color capabilities as the original OCS machines but have some screen resolution upgrades.

=== Amiga AGA ===
Amigas with the AGA chipset could display 256 colors at once out of a 24-bit RGB palette, or 18-bit at once in HAM mode.

256 colors
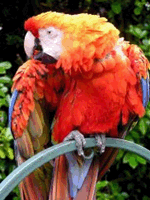

== Apple ==
=== Apple IIGS ===
Apple IIGS, along with full compatible graphic modes with the Apple II, features a custom Video Graphics Chip (VGC) which supports a 12-bit RGB, 4,096-color palette. It has an extended set of 320×200 and 640×200 graphic modes, (called Super High-Res modes by Apple) with different (and a bit complex) color modes:

- 320×200 with 16 palettes of 16 selected colors out of 4,096 each. Every single scan line can be assigned to one of the sixteen palettes, so it can have up to 16×16=256 different simultaneous colors (although some common colors like black and white are usually shared among the different palettes, giving fewer than 256 total different colors). The most simple way to use this mode is having a unique 16-color selection for the entire screen and assign it to all scan lines. Here are shown the sample image both using a single shared palette and using all the 16 palettes (in this case, by dividing the image into 16 strips):

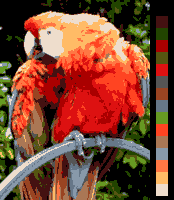
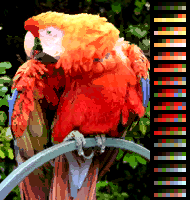

- 640×200 with 16 palettes of 8 selected colors out of 4,096 each. Every single scan line can be assigned to one of the sixteen palettes, so it can have up to 8×16=128 different simultaneous colors (usually less due to shared colors). In a single scan line, even column pixels can have one of the first four colors of the line's assigned palette, and odd column pixels one of the last four colors of the eight. The most simple way to use this mode is having a unique 8-color selection for the entire screen with four duplicate colors (the same to both even and odd pixel columns) and assign it to all scan lines. Here are shown the sample image both with a single shared custom 4-color palette and with a single 8-color palette (black, blue, yellow, white, black (again), red, green, white (again)) to produce 13 dithered-by-hardware colors, ("dark blue", "dark yellow", "gray", "dark red", "magenta", "orange", "light red", "dark green", "cyan", "lime green", "light green", "light blue", and "light yellow") plus pure black and white. The last was the Apple IIGS Finder default mode and palette.

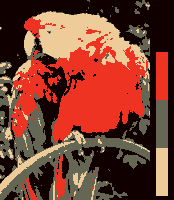
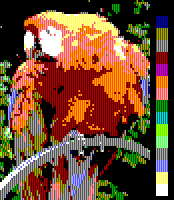

Also, along with the one of 16 palettes, to each scan line the Apple IIGS VGC is able to assign individual 320 or 640 horizontal resolution independently. The closest output would be:

0x0	0x1	0x2	0x3	0x4	0x5	0x6	0x7	0x8	0x9	0xA	0xB	0xC	0xD	0xE	0xF

== Sharp ==
=== X68000 ===
The X68000, released in 1987, uses a 16-bit RGB palette. All 65,536 colors can be displayed simultaneously in resolutions up to 512x512, or 16 out of 65,536 colors at the highest resolution of 1024x1024.

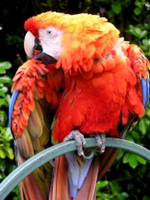

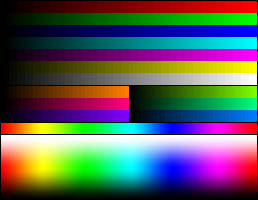

== IBM PC/AT and compatible systems ==
=== EGA ===
The Enhanced Graphics Adapter (EGA) supports all CGA modes and add three more: two 320×200 and 640×200 graphic modes, both with the full CGA 16-color palette (intended to be used with the same "digital RGB" CGA color monitor of 200 scan lines) and an extra 640×350 graphic mode with 16 colors chosen from a 6-bit RGB (64 colors) palette for what IBM then called an "analog RGB" type monitor.

The word analog means here that the RGB signals can have more than the bare two possible levels 0 and 1; (as the so-called —by IBM— "digital RGB" CGA monitor type has) despite its name, colors are produced digitally, so there exist binary (quantized) steps for every primary RGB signal (two bits, four levels per primary, in this case). Thus, the EGA signal from the computer to this kind of monitor had two wires for each primary red, green and blue. IBM developed a true analog video interface later, for the more advanced MCGA and VGA display adapters and monitors (and earlier, for the Professional Graphics Controller, announced simultaneously with the EGA) which are unrelated to (and incompatible with) the EGA "analog" monitors; see the next section.

Some early EGA cards shipped with only 64 KB of video memory—the nominal was 128 KB, up to a maximum of 256 KB to allow more screen pages in memory. With only 64 KB, the EGA 640×350 graphic mode provides only four colors. 4-color 640×350 graphics was never a proper mode by itself (merely a conditional downgrade of the 640×350 16-color mode) and therefore was not popular.

Monochrome "analog" monitors also existed for EGA. The colors are then mapped internally to the correspondent luminance gray, (the sum of the 30% of the red signal, the 59% of the green and the 11% of the blue) giving a 16-shades from a 64-grayscale palette. "Positive" class monitors inverts the signal, providing that the default EGA colors for text modes (black background and white foreground) displays reversed, (white background and black foreground) as if were a printed document.

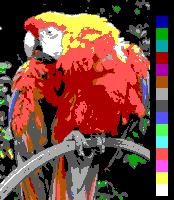
16-color CGA

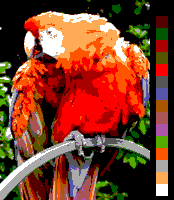
16-color EGA

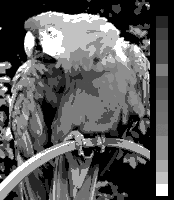
EGA on monochrome monitor

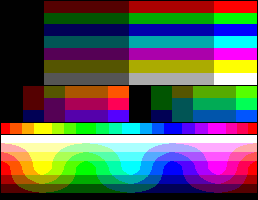
EGA palette

EGA color palette
0x00	0x01	0x02	0x03	0x04	0x05	0x06	0x07
0x08	0x09	0x0A	0x0B	0x0C	0x0D	0x0E	0x0F
0x10	0x11	0x12	0x13	0x14	0x15	0x16	0x17
0x18	0x19	0x1A	0x1B	0x1C	0x1D	0x1E	0x1F
0x20	0x21	0x22	0x23	0x24	0x25	0x26	0x27
0x28	0x29	0x2A	0x2B	0x2C	0x2D	0x2E	0x2F
0x30	0x31	0x32	0x33	0x34	0x35	0x36	0x37
0x38	0x39	0x3A	0x3B	0x3C	0x3D	0x3E	0x3F

Note: The colors underlined exist in the CGA palette; as well as it is used as default 16-color EGA color palette.

=== PGC (Professional Graphics Controller) ===
The Professional Graphics Controller used a 12-bit RGB palette (4096 colors), from which 256 could be displayed. Targeted at the CAD market this mode has limited software support, although some clone boards exist.

=== MCGA and VGA ===
The Multi-Color Graphics Array (MCGA) and Video Graphics Array (VGA) used a 6-bits per channel, 64 level digital-to-analog converter to give an 18-bit RGB palette (262,144 colors), from which can be selected any 2, 16, or 256 at a time. They both provided full compatibility with CGA modes, while VGA included all the EGA modes as well as the MCGA modes. When connected to analog monochrome monitors, they offered 64 levels of grey. Some of the first portable PCs featured a flat monochrome plasma display with a VGA in shades of red.

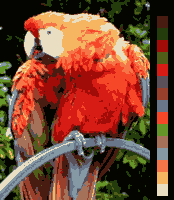
16 colors

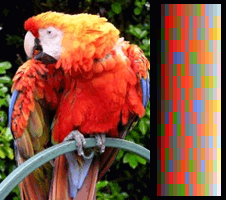
256 colors

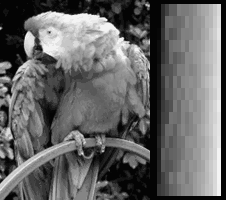
64 shades on grayscale display

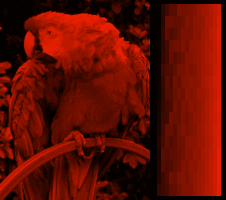
64 shades on red plasma display

=== 8514/A and XGA ===
The 8514/A uses the 18-bit RGB palette from which the user could select any 256 at a time in both 640×480 and 1024×768 graphic modes. It does not support compatibility with VGA modes, but a VGA card is usually already installed and bridged to the 8514/A to provide a single output cable for a single monitor which can display any of all VGA and 8514/A possible modes.

The Extended Graphics Array (XGA) supports all 8514/A modes plus an 800×600 16-bit RGB Highcolor mode, with 65,536 simultaneous colors on screen.

=== Super VGA (SVGA) ===
Enhanced clones of the IBM VGA, known as Super VGA, (SVGA) support 256 simultaneous colors in 640×480 and higher pixel resolutions (800×600, 1024×768) in both 16 and 256 picked colors from the VGA 18-bit RGB palette, depending on the model and the manufacturer. Also, some SVGA cards support 15- and 16-bit RGB Highcolor modes, with 32,768 or 65,536 simultaneous colors on screen in 640×480 and higher resolutions. Some later models reach the 24-bit RGB true-color modes.

In the 1990s, most manufacturers adhered to the VESA BIOS Extensions (VBE), used for enabling standard support for advanced video modes (at high resolutions and color depths).

They are the direct predecessors, not the IBM 8514/A nor XGA, of actual graphic display PC hardware.

== 32-bit mixed architecture ==
=== IBM PC/AT and compatible systems ===
==== XGA ====
See 8514/A and XGA above

==== SVGA ====
See Super VGA above

== See also ==
- List of color palettes
- List of software palettes
- List of video game console palettes
- List of monochrome and RGB color formats
- List of 8-bit computer hardware graphics
- Palette (computing)
- Indexed color
- Color Lookup Table
- Color depth
