= List of monochrome and RGB color formats =

This list of monochrome and RGB palettes includes generic repertoires of colors (color palettes) to produce black-and-white and RGB color pictures by a computer's display hardware. RGB is the most common method to produce colors for displays; so these complete RGB color repertoires have every possible combination of R-G-B triplets within any given maximum number of levels per component.

Each palette is represented by a series of color patches. When the number of colors is low, a 1-pixel-size version of the palette appears below it, for easily comparing relative palette sizes. Huge palettes are given directly in one-color-per-pixel color patches.

For each unique palette, an image color test chart and sample image (truecolor original follows) rendered with that palette (without dithering) are given. The test chart shows the full 256 levels of the red, green, and blue (RGB) primary colors and cyan, magenta, and yellow complementary colors, along with a full 256-level grayscale. Gradients of RGB intermediate colors (orange, lime green, sea green, sky blue, violet, and fuchsia), and a full hue spectrum are also present. Color charts are not gamma corrected.

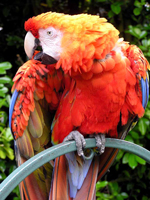

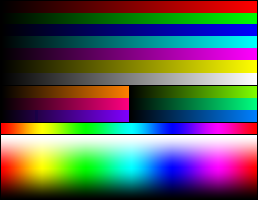

These elements illustrate the color depth and distribution of the colors of any given palette, and the sample image indicates how the color selection of such palettes could represent real-life images. These images are not necessarily representative of how the image would be displayed on the original graphics hardware, as the hardware may have additional limitations regarding the maximum display resolution, pixel aspect ratio and color placement.

Implementation of these formats is specific to each machine. Therefore, the number of colors that can be simultaneously displayed in a given text or graphic mode might be different. Also, the actual displayed colors are subject to the output format used – PAL or NTSC, composite or component video, etc. – and might be slightly different.

For simulated images and specific hardware and alternate methods to produce colors other than RGB (ex: composite), see the List of 8-bit computer hardware palettes, the List of 16-bit computer hardware palettes and the List of video game console palettes. For various software arrangements and sorts of colors, including other possible full RGB arrangements within 8-bit color depth displays, see the List of software palettes.

== Monochrome palettes ==
These palettes only have some shades of gray, from black to white (considered the darkest and lightest "grays", respectively). The general rule is that those palettes have 2^{n} different shades of gray, where n is the number of bits needed to represent a single pixel.

=== Monochrome (1-bit grayscale) ===
Monochrome graphics displays typically have a black background with a white or light gray image, though green and amber monochrome monitors were also common. Such a palette requires only one bit per pixel.

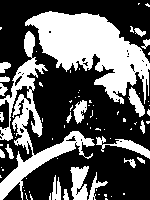

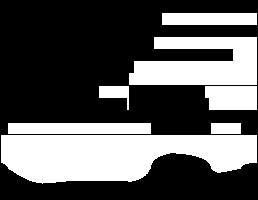

Where photo-realism was desired, these early computer systems had a heavy reliance on dithering to make up for the limits of the technology.

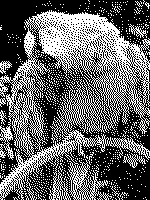

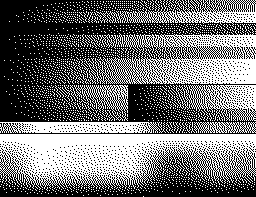

In some systems, as Hercules and CGA graphic cards for the IBM PC, a bit value of 1 represents white pixels (light on) and a value of 0 the black ones (light off); others, like the Playdate and Atari ST and Apple Macintosh with monochrome monitors, a bit value of 0 means a white pixel (no ink) and a value of 1 means a black pixel (dot of ink), which it approximates to the printing logic.

=== 2-bit Grayscale ===
In a 2-bit color palette each pixel's value is represented by 2 bits resulting in a 4-value palette (2^{2} = 4).

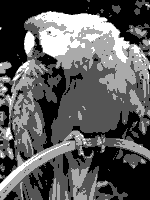

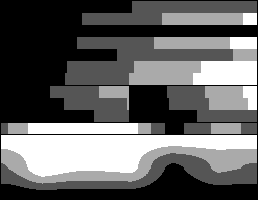

2-bit dithering:

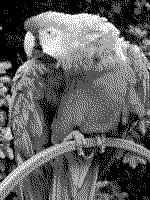

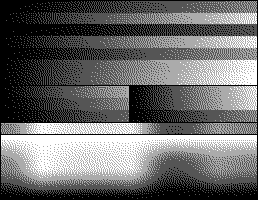

It has black, white and two intermediate levels of gray as follows:

A monochrome 2-bit palette is used on:

- The Monochrome Display Adapter for the IBM PC
- NeXT Computer, NeXTcube and NeXTstation monochrome graphic displays.
- Original Game Boy system portable video game console.
- Macintosh PowerBook 150 monochrome LC displays.
- Amiga with A2024 monochrome monitor in high-resolution mode.
- The original Amazon Kindle
- The original WonderSwan
- The Tiger Electronics Game.com portable video game console
- The original Neo Geo Pocket.

=== 4-bit Grayscale ===
In a 4-bit color palette each pixel's value is represented by 4 bits resulting in a 16-value palette (2^{4} = 16):

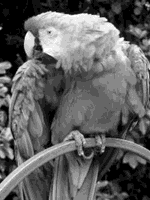

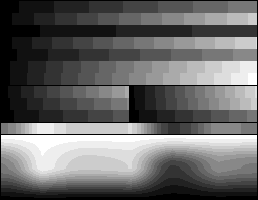

4-bit grayscale dithering does a fairly good job of reducing visible banding of the level changes:

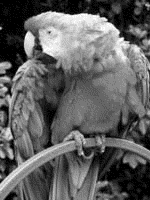

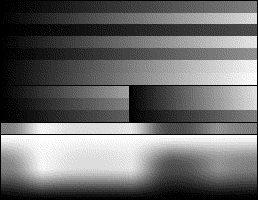

A monochrome 4-bit palette is used on:

- MOS Technology VDC (on the Commodore 128 with monochrome monitor)
- Amstrad CPC series with a GT64/GT65 Green Monitor (16 unique green shades)
- Amstrad CPC Plus series with the MM12 Monochrome monitor (16 shades of grey)
- Some Apple PowerBooks equipped with monochrome displays like the PowerBook 5300
- The original VideoNow

=== 8-bit Grayscale ===
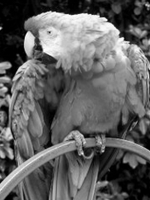

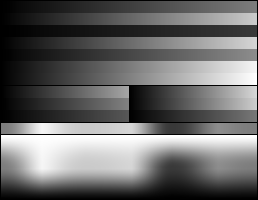

In an 8-bit color palette each pixel's value is represented by 8 bits resulting in a 256-value palette (2^{8} = 256). This is usually the maximum number of grays in ordinary monochrome systems; each image pixel occupies a single memory byte.

Most scanners can capture images in 8-bit grayscale, and image file formats like TIFF and JPEG natively support this monochrome palette size.

Alpha channels employed for video overlay also use (conceptually) this palette. The gray level indicates the opacity of the blended image pixel over the background image pixel.

== Dichrome palettes ==
=== 16-bit RG palette ===
The RG or red–green color space is a color space that uses only two primary colors: red and green. It was used on early color processes for films.

It was used as an additive format, similar to the RGB color model but without a blue channel, on processes such as Kinemacolor, Prizma, Technicolor I, Raycol, etc., producing shades of black, red, green and yellow. Alternatively, it was used as a subtractive format on Brewster Color I, Kodachrome I, Prizma II, Technicolor II, etc., producing shades of transparent, red, green and black.

Until recently, its primary use was in low-cost light-emitting diode displays in which red and green tended to be far more common than the still nascent blue LED technology, but full-color LEDs with blue have become more common in recent years.

ColorCode 3-D, a anaglyph stereoscopic color scheme, uses the RG color space to simulate a broad spectrum of color in one eye, while the blue portion of the spectrum transmits a black-and-white (black-and-blue) image to the other eye to give depth perception.

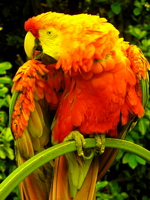
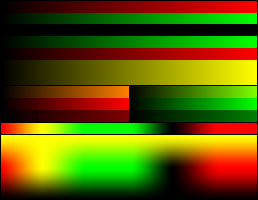
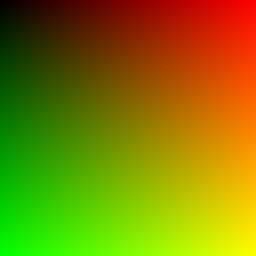
Additive RG	Additive RG color palette

=== 16-bit RB palette ===
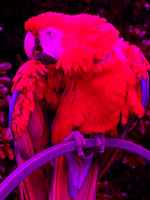
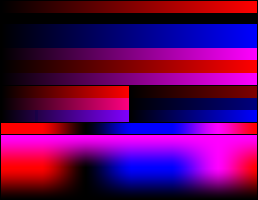
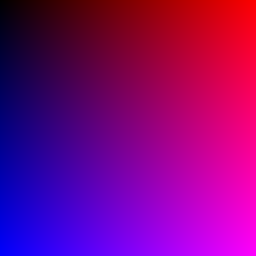
Additive RB	Additive RB color palette

=== 16-bit GB palette ===
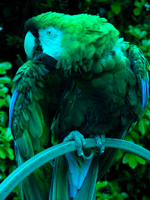
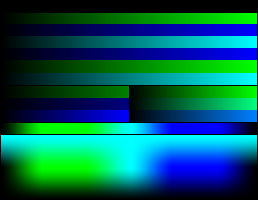
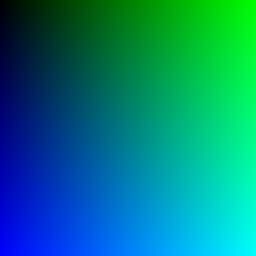
Additive GB	Additive GB color palette

== Regular RGB palettes ==
Here are grouped those full RGB hardware palettes that have the same number of binary levels (i.e., the same number of bits) for every red, green and blue components using the full RGB color model. Thus, the total number of colors are always the number of possible levels by component, n, raised to a power of 3: n×n×n = n^{3}.

=== 3-bit RGB ===
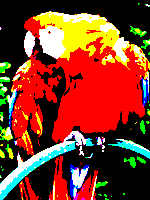

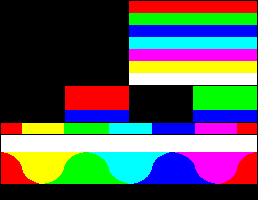

3-bit RGB dithering:

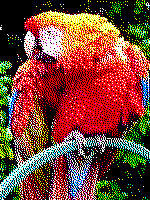

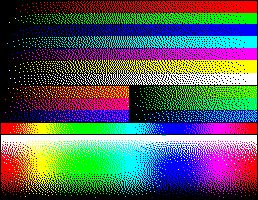

Systems with a 3-bit RGB palette use 1 bit for each of the red, green and blue color components. That is, each component is either "on" or "off" with no intermediate states. This results in an 8-color palette ((2^{1})^{3} = 2^{3} = 8) that has black, white, the three RGB primary colors red, green and blue and their correspondent complementary colors cyan, magenta and yellow as follows:

The color indices vary between implementations; therefore, index numbers are not given.

The 3-bit RGB palette is used by:

- Text terminals following the ECMA-48 standard (sometimes known as the "ANSI standard", although ANSI X3.128 does not define colors)
- World System Teletext Level 1/1.5
- Videotex
- Oric computers
- BBC Micro
- PC-8801 (up to the MkII)
- PC-9801 (with original 8086 CPU, before the VM/VX models)
- Sharp X1 (models before the X1 Turbo Z)
- Sharp MZ 700
- FM-7, FM New 7, FM 77 (before the FM77AV)
- Sinclair QL
- Space Invaders Part II (arcade hardware)
- Macintosh SE (with a color printer or external monitor)
- Atari 2600 (SECAM version)
- Color Maximite (PIC32 based microcomputer)
- Arcadia 2001
- PV-1000
- Monkey Magic (arcade hardware)
- VIC-20 (high-res mode)
- Mouse Trap (arcade hardware)
- Sanyo MBC-550 series
- Windows 1.0 (includes dithering)

=== 6-bit RGB ===
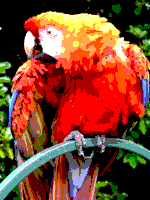

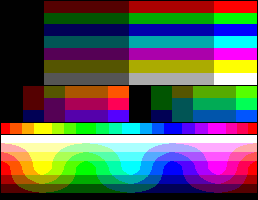

Systems with a 6-bit RGB palette use 2 bits for each of the red, green, and blue color components. This results in a (2^{2})^{3} = 4^{3} = 64-color palette as follows:

6-bit RGB systems include the following:

- Enhanced Graphics Adapter (EGA) for IBM PC/AT (16 colors at once)
- Sega Master System video game console (32 colors at once)
- GIME for TRS-80 Color Computer 3 (16 colors at once)
- Pebble Time smartwatch which has a 6-bit (64 color) e-paper display
- Parallax Propeller using the reference VGA circuit

=== 9-bit RGB ===
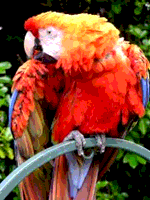

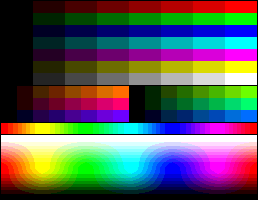

Systems with a 9-bit RGB palette use 3 bits for each of the red, green, and blue color components. This results in a (2^{3})^{3} = 8^{3} = 512-color palette as follows:

9-bit RGB systems include the following:

- Atari ST (Normally 4 to 16 at once without tricks)
- MSX2 computers (up to 16 at once)
- Sega Genesis/Mega Drive video game console, (64 colors at once)
- Sega Nomad
- TurboGrafx-16 (NEC PC-Engine)
- ZX Spectrum Next
- The NEC PC-8801 Mk II SR and later models (8 colors at once)
- The Mindset computer (16 colors at once)
- The Sega Pico (61 colors at once)

=== 12-bit RGB ===
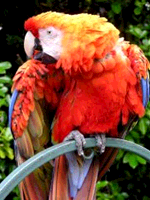

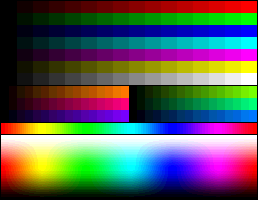

Systems with a 12-bit RGB palette use 4 bits for each of the red, green, and blue color components. This results in a (2^{4})^{3} = 16^{3} = 4096-color palette. 12-bit color can be represented with three hexadecimal digits, also known as shorthand hexadecimal form, which is commonly used in web design. The palette is as follows:

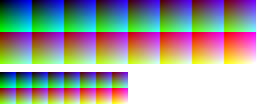

12-bit RGB systems include the following:

- Amiga OCS/ECS (32, 64, or 4,096 colors)
- Apple IIGS Video Graphics Chip (3,200 colors)
- Atari STe (16 colors)
- Acorn Archimedes
- E-readers and smartdevices with a Kaleido E-ink display
- Sega Game Gear (32 colors)
- Hi-Text Level 2.5+ Teletext
- Neo Geo Pocket Color (147 colors)
- Atari Lynx (16 colors)
- NEC PC-9801 VM/VX models typically equipped with a NEC V30 or better, but before the PC9821 Series.
- The Sharp X1 Turbo Z Series
- Fujitsu FM-77AV
- The Amstrad CPC 664Plus, 6128Plus and GX4000 (32 colors)
- NeXTstation Color and NeXTstation Turbo Color
- WonderSwan Color
- Thomson TO8
- IBM PCs with Professional Graphics Controller

The Allegro library supported in the (legacy) version 4, an emulated 12-bit color mode example code ("ex12bit.c"), using 8-bit indexed color in VGA/SVGA. It used two pixels for each emulated pixel, paired horizontally, and a specifically adapted 256-color palette. One range of the palette was many brightnesses of one primary color (say green), and another range of the other two primaries mixed together at different amounts and brightnesses (red and blue). It effectively reduced the horizontal resolution by half, but allowed a 12-bit "true color" in DOS and other 8-bit VGA/SVGA modes. The effect also somewhat reduced the total brightness of the screen.

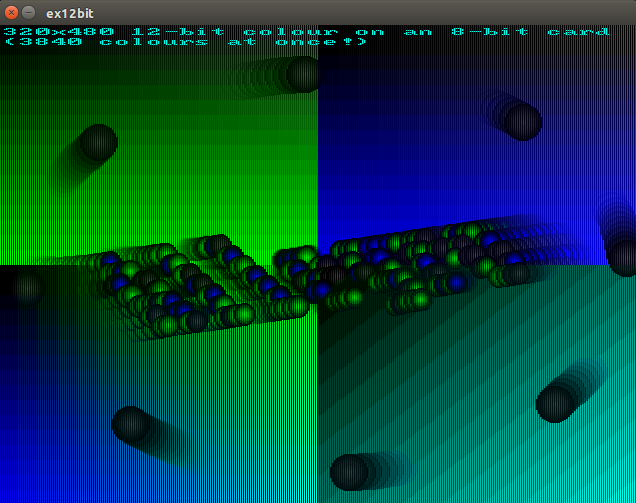

=== 15-bit RGB ===
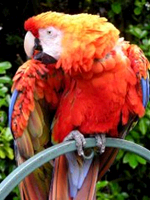

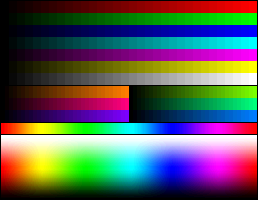

Systems with a 15-bit RGB palette use 5 bits for each of the red, green, and blue color components. This results in a (2^{5})^{3} = 32^{3} = 32,768-color palette (commonly known as Highcolor) as follows:

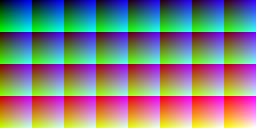

15-bit systems include:

- Super Nintendo Entertainment System (256 colors)
- Truevision TARGA and AT-Vista graphic cards for IBM PC/AT and compatibles, and NU-Vista for Macintosh
- Later models of Super VGA (SVGA) IBM PC compatible graphic cards
- Nintendo Game Boy Color/Advance/SP/Micro pocket video game consoles (Color: 56 colors, Advance/SP/Micro: 512 colors)
- Nintendo DS (2D output)
- Neo Geo AES/Neo Geo CD video game consoles (4096 colors)
- The Sega 32X Addon for the Mega Drive/Genesis
- While the PlayStation utilized a 24-bit color depth for calculations and video, textures applied to 3D objects had a maximum color depth of 15-bit.

=== 18-bit RGB ===
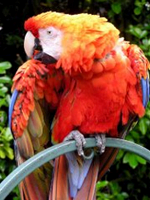

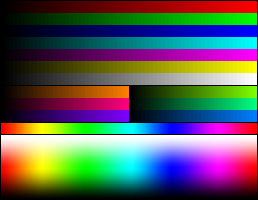

Systems with an 18-bit RGB palette use 6 bits for each of the red, green, and blue color components. This results in a (2^{6})^{3} = 64^{3} = 262,144-color palette as follows:

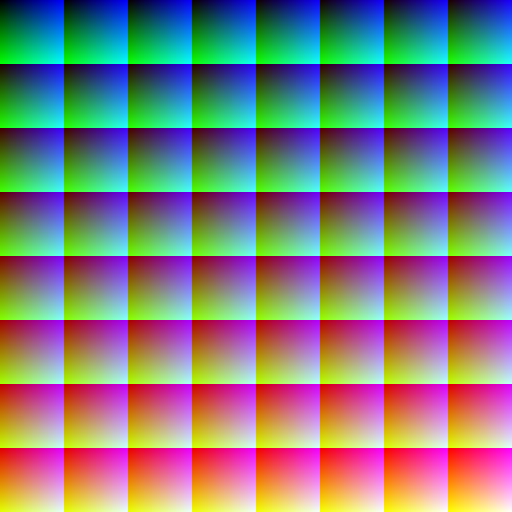

18-bit RGB systems include the following:

- IBM 8514, MCGA, VGA for IBM PC compatibles (256 colors out of 262,144)
- Atari Falcon (256 colors)
- Nintendo DS (3D output and 2D blended output)
- Used internally by many LCD monitors

=== 24-bit RGB ===
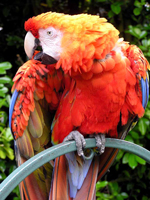

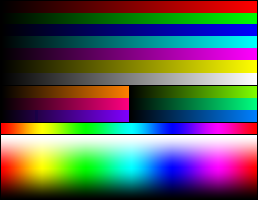

Often known as truecolor and millions of colors, 24-bit color is the highest color depth normally used, and is available on most modern display systems and software. Its color palette contains (2^{8})^{3} = 256^{3} = 16,777,216 colors. 24-bit color can be represented with six hexadecimal digits.

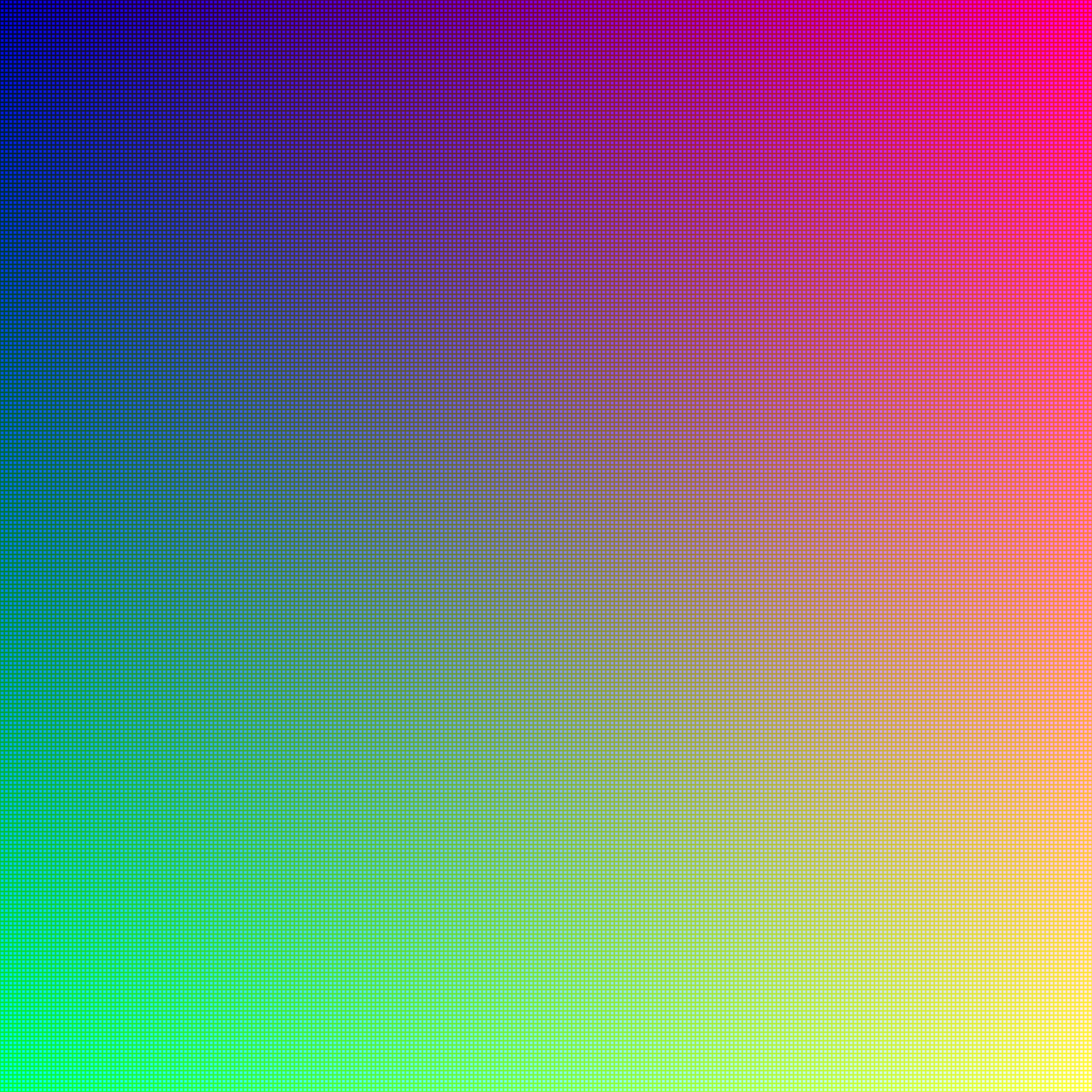
All 16,777,216 colors (downscaled, click or tap image for full resolution)

The complete palette (shown above) needs a squared image of 4,096 pixels wide (48 MB uncompressed), and there is not enough room in this page to show it at full.

This can be imagined as 256 stacked squares like the following, every one of them having the same given value for the red component, from 0 to 255.

The color transitions in these patches must be seen as continuous. If color stepping (banding) inside is visible, then probably the display is set to a Highcolor (15- or 16- bits RGB, 32,768 or 65,536 colors) mode or lesser.

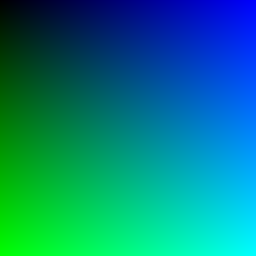
Red = 0

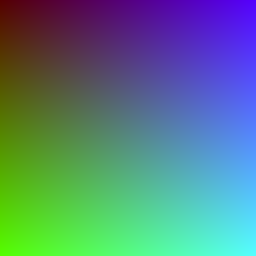
Red = 85 (1/3 of 255)

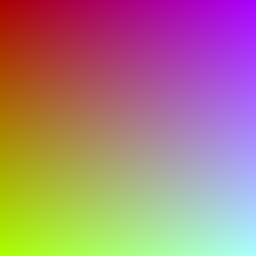
Red = 170 (2/3 of 255)

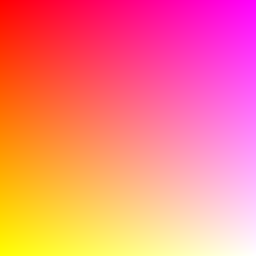
Red = 255

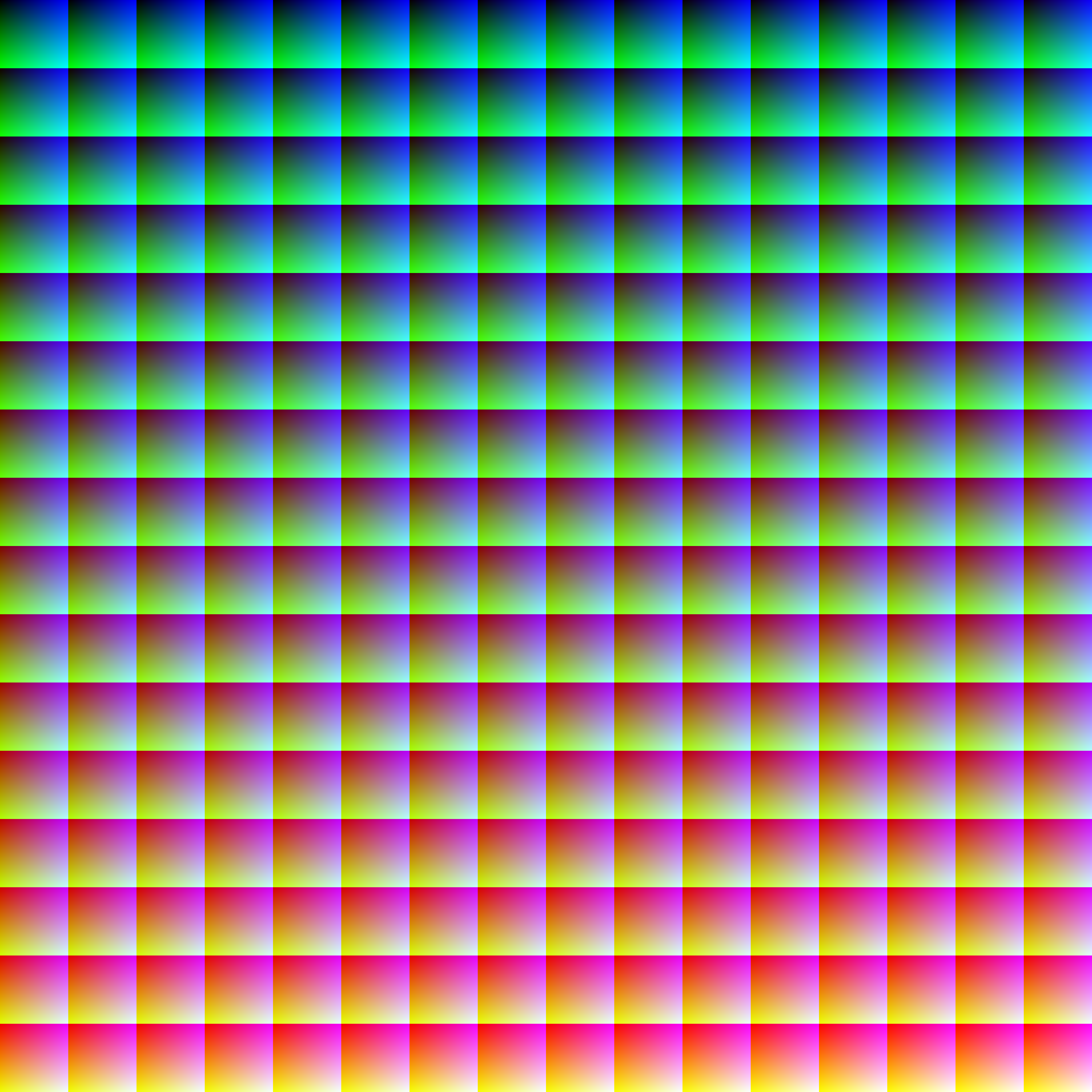
All 16,777,216 colors in the same pattern as the other RGB palettes above (downscaled, click image for full resolution)

This is also the number of colors used in true color image files, like Truevision TGA, TIFF, JPEG (the last internally encoded as YCbCr) and Windows Bitmap, captured with scanners and digital cameras, as well as those created with 3D computer graphics software.

24-bit RGB systems include:

- Sega Dreamcast (16777216 colors)
- Amiga Advanced Graphics Architecture (256 or 262,144 colors)
- Nintendo 3DS
- Original PlayStation
- PlayStation Portable and Vita
- Later models of Super VGA (SVGA) IBM PC compatible graphic cards
- Truevision AT-Vista graphic cards for IBM PC/AT and compatibles, and NU-Vista for Macintosh.
- The Philips CD-i
- Nintendo Switch

=== 30-bit RGB ===
Some newer graphics cards support 30-bit RGB and more. Its color palette contains (2^{10})^{3} = 1024^{3} = 1,073,741,824 colors. However, there are few operating systems or applications that support this mode yet. For some people, it may be hard to distinguish between higher color palettes than 24-bit color offers. However, the range of luminance, or gray scale, offered in a 30-bit color system would have 1,024 levels of luminance rather than the 256 of the common standard 24-bit, to which the human eye is more sensitive than to hue. This reduces the banding effect for gradients across large areas.

== Non-regular RGB palettes ==
These also are full RGB palette repertories, but either they do not have the same number of levels for every red, green and blue components, or they are bit levels based. Nevertheless, all of them are used in very popular personal computers.

For further details on color palettes for these systems, see the article List of 8-bit computer hardware palettes.

=== 4-bit RGBI ===
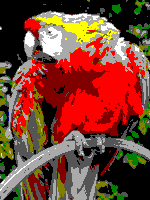

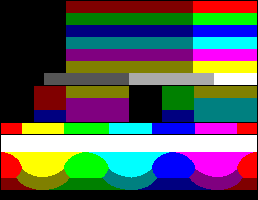

The 4-bit RGBI palette is similar to the 3-bit RGB palette but adds one bit for intensity. This allows each of the colors of the 3-bit palette to have a dark and bright variant, potentially giving a total of 2^{3}×2 = 16 colors. However, some implementations had only 15 effective colors due to the "dark" and "bright" variations of black being displayed identically.

This 4-bit RGBI schema is used in several platforms with variations, so the table given below is a simple reference for the palette richness, and not an actual implemented palette. For this reason, no numbers are assigned to each color, and color order is arbitrary.

Note that "dark white" is a lighter gray than "bright black" in this example.

==== IBM PC graphics ====
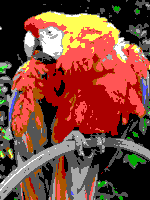

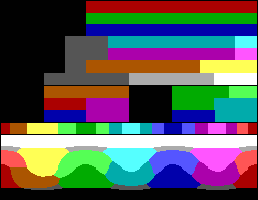

A common use of 4-bit RGBI was on IBM PCs and compatible computers that used a 9-pin DE-9 connector for color output. These computers used a modified "dark yellow" color that appeared to be brown. On displays designed for the IBM PC, setting a color "bright" added 1/3 of the maximum to all three channels' brightness, so the "bright" colors were whiter shades of their 3-bit counterparts. Each of the other bits increased a channel by 2/3, except that dark yellow had only 1/3 green and was therefore brown instead of ochre.

PC graphics standards using this RGBI mode include:

- IBM's original Color Graphics Adapter.
- IBM's Enhanced Graphics Adapter, in CGA modes
- "Tandy graphics" on IBM's PCjr and Tandy 1000-series computers.
- Plantronics Colorplus on a limited number of PC-compatible computers.

The CGA palette is also used by default by IBM's later EGA, MCGA, and VGA graphics standards for backward compatibility, but these standards allow the palette to be changed, since they either provide extra video signal lines or use analog RGB output.

The MOS Technology 8563 and 8568 Video Display Controller chips used on the Commodore 128 series for its 80-column mode (and the unreleased Commodore 900 workstation) also used the same palette used on the IBM PC, since these chips were designed to work with existing CGA PC monitors.

==== Other uses ====
Other systems using a variation of the 4-bit RGBI mode include:

- The ZX Spectrum series of computers, which lack distinct "dark" and "light" black colors, resulting in an effective 15-color palette.
- The Sharp MZ-800 series computers.
- The Thomson MO5 and TO7 where the intensity bit created a variation of saturation ("saturated" or "pastel").
- The Mattel Aquarius and AlphaTantel (using the TEA1002 video encoder chip) where the intensity bit created a variations of brightness and saturation. There are three bits for the RGB components (generating 8 primary colors at full saturation but 75% luminance - similar to the EBU colour bars) and an intensity bit that controls a variation of the base color (a 75% luminance decrease for white, creating gray; a 50% chroma saturation decrease for the RGB primary colors).
- The Magnavox Odyssey 2 is equipped with an Intel 8244 (NTSC) or 8245 (PAL) custom IC, and uses a 4-bit RGBI color palette. Bits 0 to 2 define Grid color, bits 3 to 5 define Background color, bit 6 defines Grid luminance (0=dim/1=bright) and bit 7 is unused.
- The Tandy 2000 Graphics Adapter with Color Graphics Option.
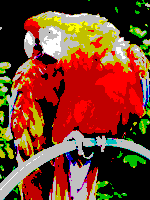
Sample image rendered using the ZX Spectrum 4-bit RGBI color palette

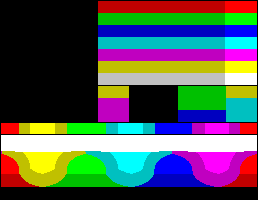
Color chart rendered using the ZX Spectrum 4-bit RGBI color palette

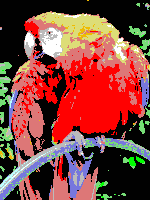
Sample image rendered using the Thomson MO5/TO7 4-bit RGBI palette

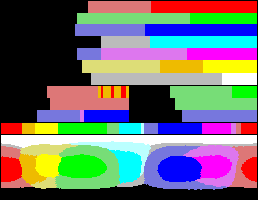
Color chart rendered using the Thomson MO5/TO7 4-bit RGBI palette

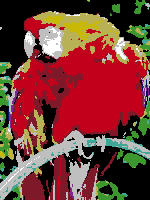
Sample image rendered using the Mattel Aquarius 4-bit RGBI palette

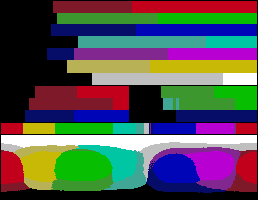
Color chart rendered using the Mattel Aquarius 4-bit RGBI palette

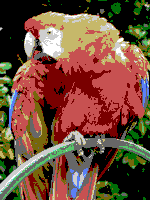
Sample image rendered using the Magnavox Odyssey 2 4-bit RGBI palette

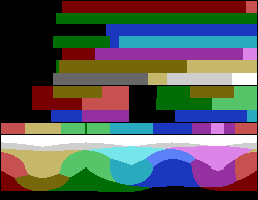
Color chart rendered using the Magnavox Odyssey 2 4-bit RGBI palette

=== 3-level RGB ===
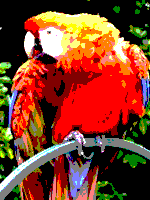

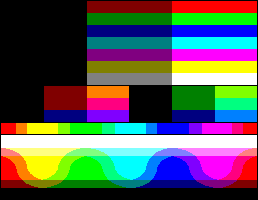

3-level RGB dithering:

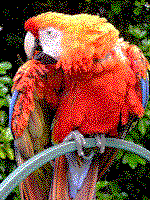

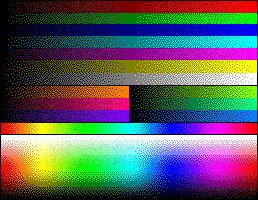

The 3-level, or 1-trit (not 3 bits) RGB uses three levels for every red, green and blue color component, resulting in a 3^{3} = 27 colors palette as follows:

This palette is used by:

- The Amstrad CPC series of personal computers excluding the Plus models (up to 16 colors simultaneously)
- The Toshiba Pasopia 7 (uses hardware dithering to simulate intermediate color intensities, based on a mix of the full intensity RGB primaries.)

=== 8-bit RGB ===
==== 3-3-2 bit RGB or 8-8-4 level RGB ====
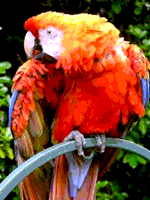

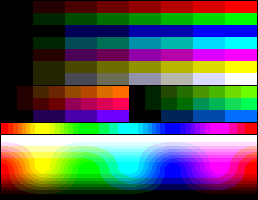

The 3-3-2 bit RGB use 3 bits for each of the red and green color components, and 2 bits for the blue component, due to the human eyes having lesser sensitivity to blue. This results in an 8×8×4 = 256-color palette as follows:

This palette is used by:

- The MSX2 series of personal computers
- Palette 4 of the IBM PGC
- Extended Graphics Array (XGA)
- Enterprise Computer
- Vector-06C, a home computer from the USSR
- VGA built-in output of the Digilent Inc. NEXYS 2, NEXYS 3 and BASYS2 FPGA boards
- The Uzebox gaming console
- SGI Indy 8-bit XL graphics
- The Tiki 100 personal computer (only 16 colors can be displayed simultaneously)
- Wear OS smartwatches with ambient display mode (only 16 colors can be displayed simultaneously)

==== 3-2-3 bit RGB or 8-4-8 level RGB ====
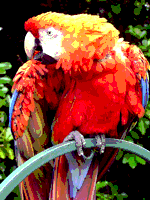

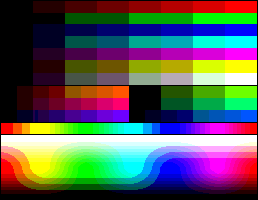

The 3-2-3 bit RGB palette uses 3 bits for the red color component, 2 bits for the green, and 3 bits for the blue. This results in an 8×4×8 = 256-color palette.

This palette is used by:

- Palette 3 of the IBM PGC

==== 2-3-3 bit RGB or 4-8-8 level RGB ====
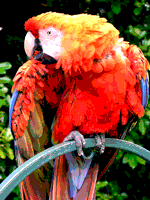

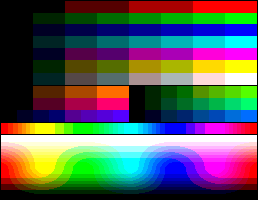

The 2-3-3 bit RGB palette uses 2 bits for the red color component, and 3 bits for the green and blue components. This results in an 4×8×8 = 256-color palette.

This palette is used by:

- Palette 2 of the IBM PGC

=== 14-bit RGB ===
==== 5-5-4 bit RGB or 32-32-16 level RGB ====
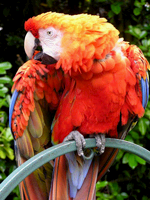

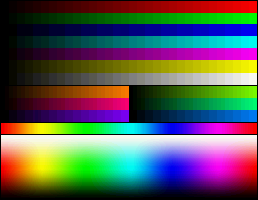

The 5-5-4 bit RGB palette uses 5 bits for the red and green color components, and 4 bits for the blue component, due to the human eyes having lesser sensitivity to blue. This results in an 32x32x16 = 16,384-color palette.

Unlike other RGB palettes, in 5-5-4 bit RGB, the bits are bitmasks of the full 8-bit components, and not fractions of them. This means the highest possible value represents #f8f8f0, rather than the expected #ffffff.

This palette is used by:

- Scratch 2.0 and early 3.0 programming language ("Touching Color" blocks)

=== 16-bit RGB (also known as RGB565) ===
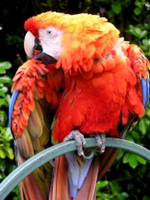

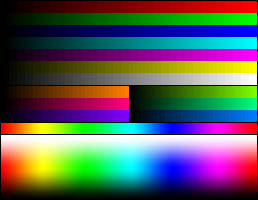

Most modern systems support 16-bit color. It is sometimes referred to as High color (along with the 15-bit RGB), medium color or thousands of colors. It utilizes a color palette of 32×64×32 = 65,536 colors. Usually, there are 5 bits allocated for the red and blue color components (32 levels each) and 6 bits for the green component (64 levels), due to the greater sensitivity of the common human eye to this color. This doubles the 15-bit RGB palette.

The 16-bit RGB palette using 6 bits for the green component:

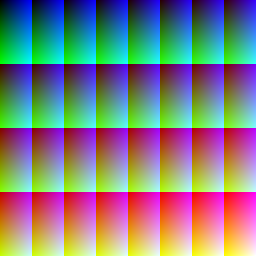

The Atari Falcon and the Extended Graphics Array (XGA) for IBM PS/2 use the 16-bit RGB palette.

Not all systems using 16-bit color depth employ the 16-bit, 32-64-32 level RGB palette. Platforms like the Sharp X68000 home computer or the Neo Geo video game console employs the 15-bit RGB palette (5 bits are used for red, green, and blue), but the last bit specifies a less significant intensity or luminance. The 16-bit mode of the Truevision TARGA/AT-Vista/NU-Vista graphic cards and its associated TGA file format also uses 15-bit RGB, but it devotes its remaining bit as a simple alpha channel for video overlay. The Atari Falcon can also be switched into a matching mode by setting of an "overlay" bit in the graphics processor mode register when in 16-bit mode, meaning it can actually display in either 15- or 16-bit color depth depending on application.

== Color palette comparison side-by-side ==
=== Basic color palettes ===
==== 4-bit grayscale ====
0x0	0x1	0x2	0x3	0x4	0x5	0x6	0x7	0x8	0x9	0xA	0xB	0xC	0xD	0xE	0xF

==== 3-bit RGB ====
0x0	0x1	0x2	0x3	0x4	0x5	0x6	0x7

==== Notes ====
- Color values in bold exist in 2-bit (four color) grayscale palette. Color values in very bold exist in 1-bit, monochrome palette.
- In 4-bit RGBI, dark colors have 2/3rds intensity of the bright colors, not 1/2.

=== Advanced color palettes ===
==== 8-bit RGB (VGA) ====
0x00	0x01	0x02	0x03	0x04	0x05	0x06	0x07	0x08	0x09	0x0A	0x0B	0x0C	0x0D	0x0E	0x0F
0x10	0x11	0x12	0x13	0x14	0x15	0x16	0x17	0x18	0x19	0x1A	0x1B	0x1C	0x1D	0x1E	0x1F
0x20	0x21	0x22	0x23	0x24	0x25	0x26	0x27	0x28	0x29	0x2A	0x2B	0x2C	0x2D	0x2E	0x2F
0x30	0x31	0x32	0x33	0x34	0x35	0x36	0x37	0x38	0x39	0x3A	0x3B	0x3C	0x3D	0x3E	0x3F
0x40	0x41	0x42	0x43	0x44	0x45	0x46	0x47	0x48	0x49	0x4A	0x4B	0x4C	0x4D	0x4E	0x4F
0x50	0x51	0x52	0x53	0x54	0x55	0x56	0x57	0x58	0x59	0x5A	0x5B	0x5C	0x5D	0x5E	0x5F
0x60	0x61	0x62	0x63	0x64	0x65	0x66	0x67	0x68	0x69	0x6A	0x6B	0x6C	0x6D	0x6E	0x6F
0x70	0x71	0x72	0x73	0x74	0x75	0x76	0x77	0x78	0x79	0x7A	0x7B	0x7C	0x7D	0x7E	0x7F
0x80	0x81	0x82	0x83	0x84	0x85	0x86	0x87	0x88	0x89	0x8A	0x8B	0x8C	0x8D	0x8E	0x8F
0x90	0x91	0x92	0x93	0x94	0x95	0x96	0x97	0x98	0x99	0x9A	0x9B	0x9C	0x9D	0x9E	0x9F
0xA0	0xA1	0xA2	0xA3	0xA4	0xA5	0xA6	0xA7	0xA8	0xA9	0xAA	0xAB	0xAC	0xAD	0xAE	0xAF
0xB0	0xB1	0xB2	0xB3	0xB4	0xB5	0xB6	0xB7	0xB8	0xB9	0xBA	0xBB	0xBC	0xBD	0xBE	0xBF
0xC0	0xC1	0xC2	0xC3	0xC4	0xC5	0xC6	0xC7	0xC8	0xC9	0xCA	0xCB	0xCC	0xCD	0xCE	0xCF
0xD0	0xD1	0xD2	0xD3	0xD4	0xD5	0xD6	0xD7	0xD8	0xD9	0xDA	0xDB	0xDC	0xDD	0xDE	0xDF
0xE0	0xE1	0xE2	0xE3	0xE4	0xE5	0xE6	0xE7	0xE8	0xE9	0xEA	0xEB	0xEC	0xED	0xEE	0xEF
0xF0	0xF1	0xF2	0xF3	0xF4	0xF5	0xF6	0xF7	0xF8	0xF9	0xFA	0xFB	0xFC	0xFD	0xFE	0xFF

== See also ==
- Bitmap
- Palette (computing)
- Grayscale
- Indexed color
- List of home computers by video hardware
- List of 8-bit computer hardware graphics
- List of 16-bit computer color palettes
- List of video game console palettes
- List of software palettes
- Computer display
