= High color =

Method of storing color

High color graphics is a method of storing image information in a computer's memory such that each pixel is represented by two bytes. The color is represented by all 16 bits, but some devices also support 15-bit high color.

In Windows 7, Microsoft used the term high color to identify display systems that can make use of more than 8-bits per color channel (10:10:10:2 or 16:16:16:16 rendering formats) from traditional 8-bit per color channel formats. This is a different and distinct usage from the 15-bit (5:5:5) or 16-bit (5:6:5) formats traditionally associated with the phrase high color; see deep color.

== 15-bit high color ==
In 15-bit high color, one of the bits of the two bytes is ignored or set aside for an alpha channel, and the remaining 15 bits are split between the red, green, and blue components of the final color.

Each of the RGB components has 5 bits associated, giving 2⁵ = 32 intensities of each component. This allows 32768 possible colors for each pixel.

The Cirrus Logic graphics chips of the early 1990s made use of the spare high-order bit for their so-called "mixed" video modes: with bit 15 clear, bits 0 through 14 would be treated as an RGB value as described above, while with bit 15 set, bit 0 through 7 would be interpreted as an 8-bit index into a 256-color palette (with bits 8 through 14 remaining unused) this enabled display of (comparatively) high-quality color images side by side with palette-animated screen elements, but this feature was hardly used by any software.

== 16-bit high color ==
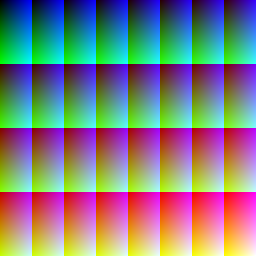
RGB 16bits palette

Human eyes are more sensitive to green light. Discontinuities in the green gradient are easier to see than in the reds, and in the blues they are the hardest to see.

When all 16 bits are used, one of the components (usually green with RGB565, see below) gets an extra bit, allowing 64 levels of intensity for that component, and a total of 65536 available colors.

This can lead to small discrepancies in encoding, e.g. when one wishes to encode the 24-bit colour RGB (40, 40, 40) with 16 bits (a problem common to subsampling). Forty in binary is 00101000. The red and blue channels will take the five most significant bits, and will have a value of 00101, or 5 on a scale from 0 to 31 (16.1%). The green channel, with six bits of precision, will have a binary value of 001010, or 10 on a scale from 0 to 63 (15.9%). Because of this, the colour RGB (40, 40, 40) will have a slight purplish (magenta) tinge when displayed in 16 bits. 40 on a scale from 0 to 255 is 15.7%. Other 24-bit colours would incur a green tinge when subsampled: for instance, the 24-bit RGB representation of 14.1% grey, i.e. (36, 36, 36), would be encoded as 4/31 (12.9%) on the red and blue channels, but 9/63 (14.3%) on the green channel, because 36 is represented as 00100100 in binary.

Green is usually chosen for the extra bit in 16 bits because the human eye has its highest sensitivity for green shades. For a demonstration, look closely at the following picture (note: this will work only on monitors displaying true color, i.e., 24 or 32 bits) where dark shades of red, green and blue are shown using 128 levels of intensities for each component (7 bits).

Readers with normal vision should see the individual shades of green relatively easily, while the shades of red should be difficult to see, and the shades of blue are likely indistinguishable. More rarely, some systems support having the extra bit of colour depth on the red or blue channel, usually in applications where that colour is more prevalent (photographing of skin tones or skies, for example).

== Other notes ==
There is generally no need for a color look up table (CLUT, or palette) when in high color mode, because there are enough available colors per pixel to represent graphics and photos reasonably satisfactorily. However, the lack of precision decreases image fidelity; as a result, some image formats (e.g., TIFF) can save paletted 16-bit images with an embedded CLUT.

== See also ==
- 24-bit color (True color)
- 30/36/48-bit color (Deep color)
- Color depth
- Planar
- Packed pixel
- List of monochrome and RGB color formats — 15-bit RGB and 16-bit RGB sections.
