= List of 8-bit computer hardware graphics =

This is a list of 8-bit computer color palettes, and graphics, which were primarily manufactured from 1975 to 1985. Although some of them use RGB palettes, more commonly they have palettes of 4, 16, or more colors that are neither bitwise nor intensity-level combinations of the RGB primaries, but instead consist of fixed colors defined by ROM or dedicated circuitry and selected by the manufacturer. Due to mixed-bit architectures, classifying these systems solely by their "n-bit" designation is not always precise. Another error is assuming that a computer's color palette represents what it can show all at once. Resolution is also a crucial aspect when criticizing an 8-bit computer, as many offer different modes with different amounts of colors on screen, and different resolutions, with the intent of trading off resolution for color, and vice versa.

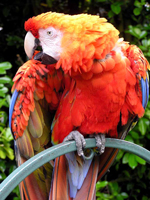
Sample image

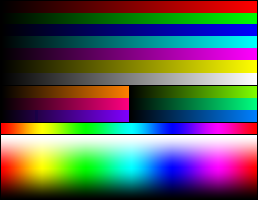
Color test chart

3-bit, 8-color palette

6-bit, 64-color palette

== 3-bit RGB palettes ==
Systems with a 3-bit RGB palette use 1 bit for each of the red, green and blue color components. That is, each component is either "on" or "off" with no intermediate states. This results in an 8-color palette ((2^{1})^{3} = 2^{3} = 8) that have black, white, the three RGB primary colors red, green and blue and their correspondent complementary colors cyan, magenta and yellow as follows:

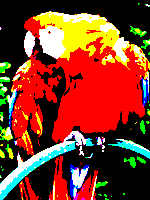
Sample image

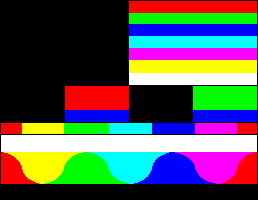
Palette coverage

Color indexes

The color indices vary between implementations; therefore, index numbers are not given. A common selection has 3 bits (from LSB to MSB) directly representing the 'Red', 'Green' and 'Blue' (RGB) components in a number from 0 to 7. An alternate arrangement uses the bit order 'Blue', 'Red', 'Green' (BRG), such that the resultant palette - in numerical order - represents an increasing level of intensity on a monochrome display.

The 3-bit RGB palette is used by:

- The ECMA-48 standard for text terminals (sometimes known as the "ANSI standard", although ANSI X3.64 does not define colors)
- Teletext Level 1/1.5 Teletext.
- Videotex
- Oric computers
- BBC Micro
- The original NEC PC-8801 up to the MkII
- The original NEC PC-9801 with original 8086 CPU before the VM/VX models
- All Sharp X1 models before the X1 Turbo Z
- The Sharp MZ 700
- Fujitsu FM-7, FM New 7, FM 77 before the FM77AV
- Sinclair QL
- The Macintosh SE with a color printer or external monitor
- The SECAM version of the Atari 2600
- The Color Maximite, a PIC32 based microcomputer
- The Thomson TO7 (with spatial constraints – only 2 colors for each group of 8×1 pixels)
- The Matra Alice 32 and 90
- The Philips VG5000

Specific details about implementation and actual graphical capabilities of specific systems, are listed on the next sub-sections.

=== World System Teletext Level 1 ===
World System Teletext Level 1 (1976) uses a 3-bit RGB, 8-color palette. Teletext has 40×25 characters per page of which the first row is reserved for a page header. Every character cell has a background color and a text color. These attributes along with others are set through control codes which each occupy one character position. Graphics characters consisting of 2×3 cells can used following a graphics color attribute. Up to a maximum of 72×69 blocky pixels can be used on a page.

Simulated image
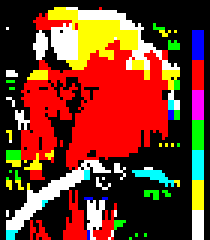

=== BBC Micro ===
BBC Micro has 8 display modes, with resolutions like 640×256 (max. 2 colors), 320×256 (max. 4 colors) and 160×256 (max. 16 logical colors). No display modes have cell attribute clashes. The palette available has only 8 physical colors, plus a further 8 flashing colors (each being one of the eight non-flashing colors alternating with its physical complement every second), and the display modes can have 16, 4 or 2 simultaneous colors.

Simulated image
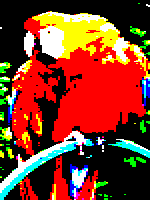

BBC Micro display modes

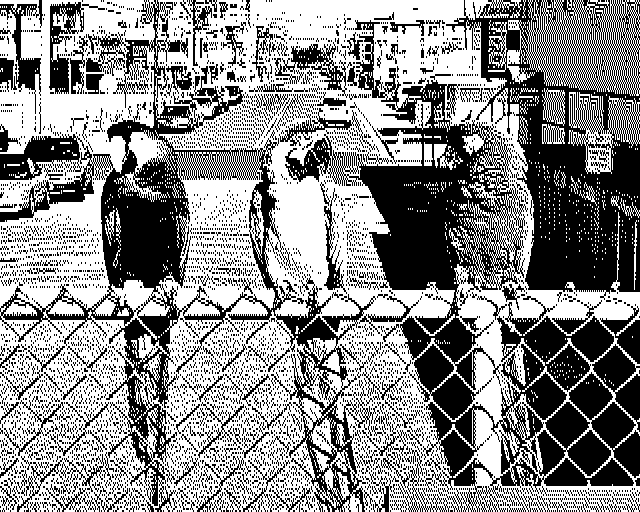
Mode 0 (640 × 256, 2 colors)

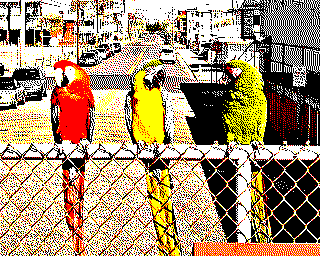
Mode 1 (320 × 256, 4 colors)

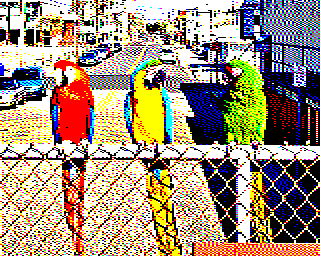
Mode 2 (160 × 256, 8 colors)

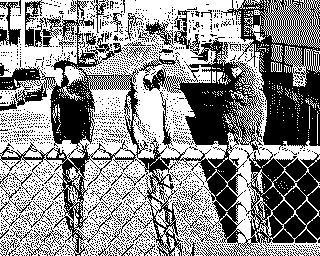
Mode 4 (320 × 256, 2 colors)

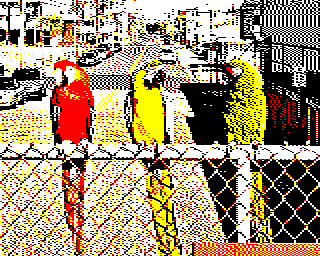
Mode 5 (160 × 256, 4 colors)

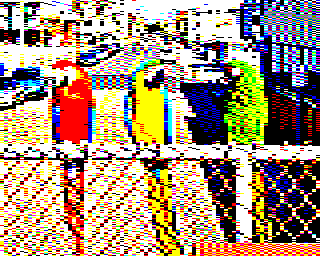
Mode 8 (80 × 256, 8 colors)

=== Sinclair QL (Sinclair Quantum Leap) ===
On the Sinclair QL two video modes were available, 256×256 pixels with 8 RGB colors and per-pixel flashing, or 512×256 pixels with four colors: black, red, green and white. The supported colors could be stippled in 2×2 blocks to simulate up to 256 colors, an effect which did not copy reliably on a TV, especially over an RF connection. Pixel aspect ratio was not square, with resulting image proportions close to 4.4:3, making the image extend into the horizontal overscan area of a CRT TV.

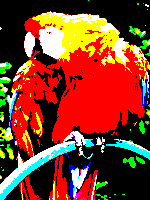
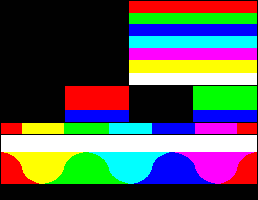
256 × 256 mode

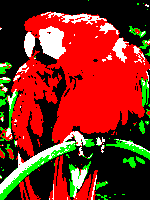
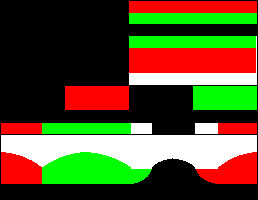
512 × 256 mode

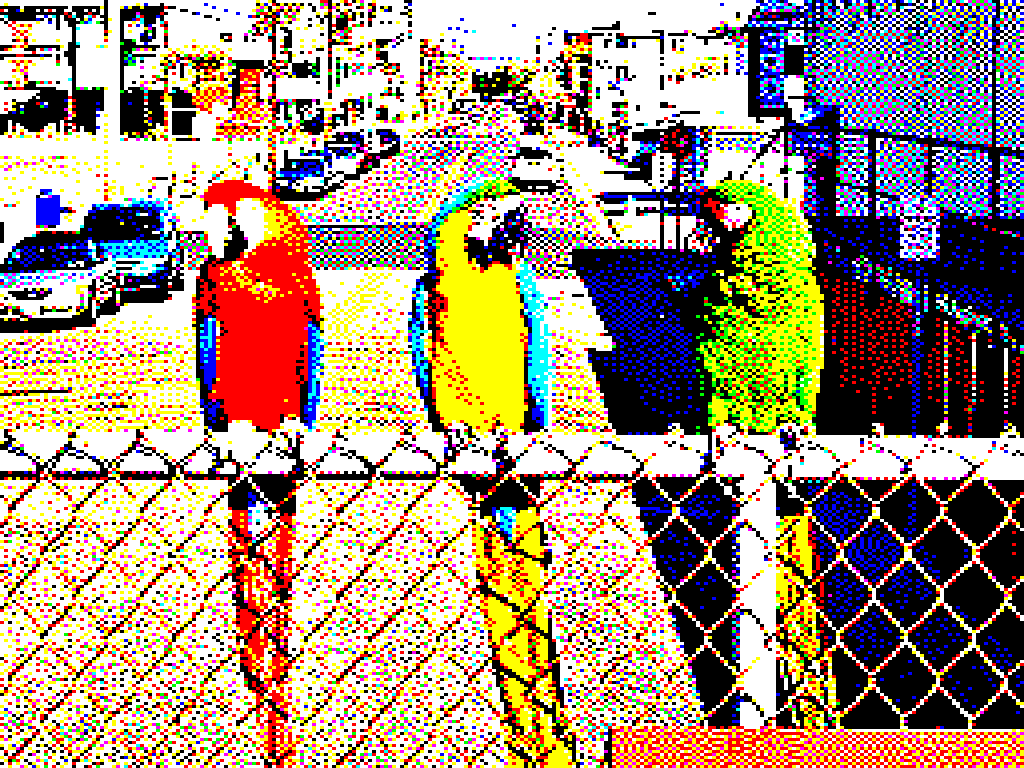
Simulated images (aspect ratio corrected)

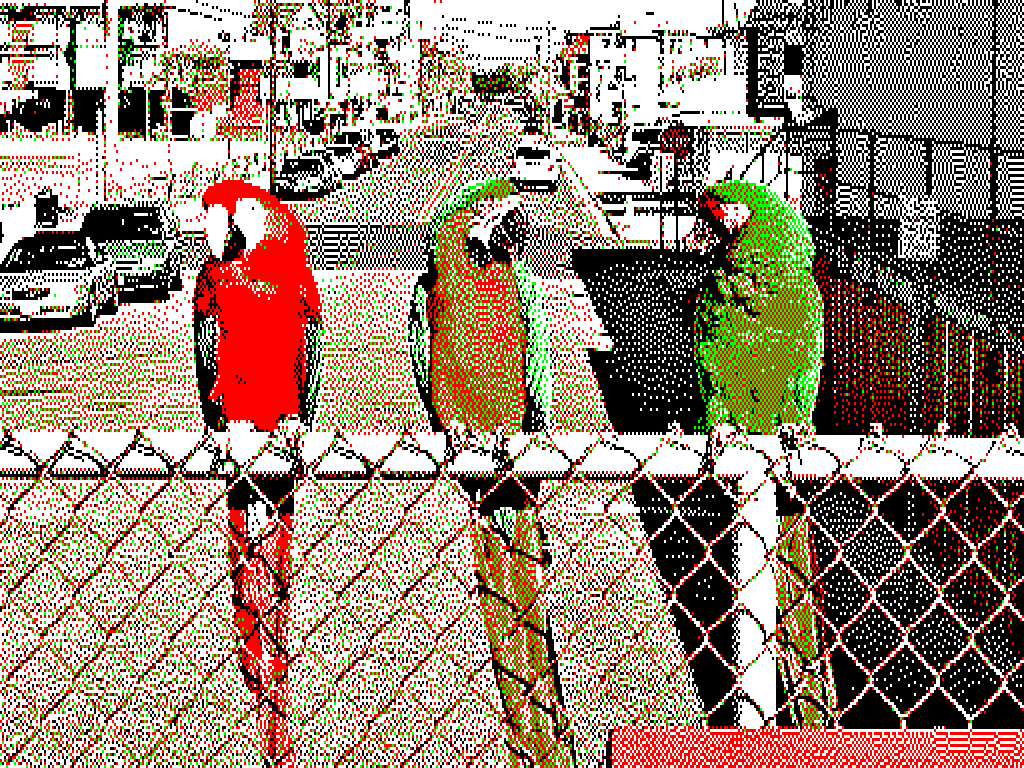

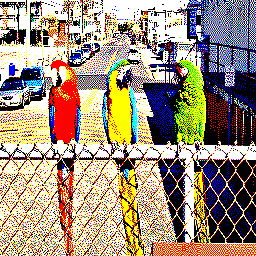
Simulated images (original pixel size)

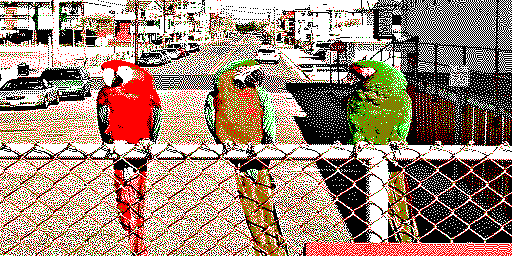

256×256	512×256
black	black
blue	black
red	red
magenta	red
green	green
cyan	green
yellow	white
white	white

=== PC-8000 series ===
The NEC PC-8000 was capable of displaying graphics with a resolution of 160x100 pixels and 8 colors.

== 4-bit RGBI palettes ==
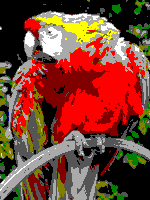

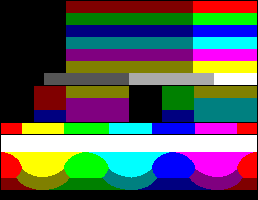

The 4-bit RGBI palette is similar to the 3-bit RGB palette but adds one bit for intensity. It contains variants of colors (dark or bright on most machines, but saturated or unsaturated was also possible) potentially giving a total of 2^{3}×2 = 16 colors. Some implementations had only 15 effective colors due to the "dark" and "bright" variations of black being displayed identically. Others generated a grey tone or a different color.

This 4-bit RGBI schema is used in several platforms with variations, so the table given below is a simple reference for the palette richness, and not an actual implemented palette. For this reason, no numbers are assigned to each color, and color order is arbitrary.

Systems that used this palette scheme:

- IBM's original Color Graphics Adapter
- IBM's Enhanced Graphics Adapter, in CGA modes
- Tandy graphics on IBM's PCjr and Tandy 1000-series computers
- Plantronics Colorplus on a limited number of PC-compatible computers
- MCGA and VGA graphics standards for backward compatibility
- Commodore 128 series for its 80-column mode
- ZX Spectrum (and compatible) (with spatial constraints – only 2 colours for each group of 8x8 pixels)
- CPC 464/664/6128
- Sharp MZ-800 series computers
- Thomson MO5 and TO7 (with spatial constraints – only 2 colours for each group of 8x1 pixels)

Specific details about implementation and actual graphical capabilities of specific systems, are listed on the next sub-sections.

=== ZX Spectrum ===
The ZX Spectrum (and compatible) computers use a variation of the 4-bit RGBI palette philosophy. This results in each of the colours of the 3-bit palette to have a basic and bright variant, with the exception of black. This was accomplished by having a maximum voltage level for the bright variant, and a lower voltage level for the basic variant. Due to this, black is the same in both variants.

The attribute byte associated with every 8×8 pixel cell comprises (from LSB to MSB): three bits for the background colour; three bits for the foreground colour; one bit for the bright variant for both, and one bit for the flashing effect (alternate foreground and background colours every 0.32 seconds). Thus the colours are not independently selectable as indices of a true palette (there are not colour numbers 8 to 15, and the bright bit affects both colours within a cell). However, within a single set of 8 colours the BRG order of bits means that the colours appear in increasing order of brightness on a monochrome display.

The colour number (0 to 7) can be employed with the following BASIC statements to choose:

- BORDER n, the colour for the surrounding area outside the pixel graphical area. This cannot use the bright variants.
- PAPER n, the background (pixel bit value of 0) colour for an 8×8 pixel cell.
- INK n, the foreground (pixel bit value of 1) colour for an 8×8 pixel cell.

And a value of 0 or 1 with the following statements to choose:

- BRIGHT n, sets the bright bit for both foreground and background colours in an 8×8 pixel cell.
- FLASH n, sets the bit that controls the flashing effect in an 8×8 pixel cell.

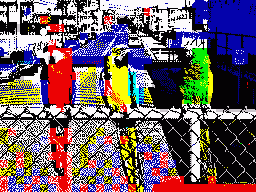
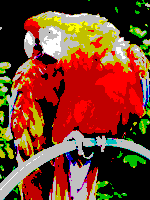
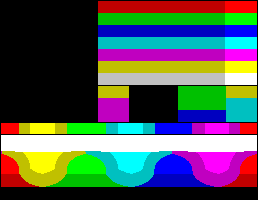
Simulated image	Sample image and palette

ZX Spectrum Hardware Palette
Colour number	Binary value				Colour name	Binary value				Colour name
Colour number	G	R	B	I	Colour name	G	R	B	I	Colour name
0	0	0	0	0	Black	0	0	0	1	Black
1	0	0	1	0	Blue	0	0	1	1	Bright Blue
2	0	1	0	0	Red	0	1	0	1	Bright Red
3	0	1	1	0	Magenta	0	1	1	1	Bright Magenta
4	1	0	0	0	Green	1	0	0	1	Bright Green
5	1	0	1	0	Cyan	1	0	1	1	Bright Cyan
6	1	1	0	0	Yellow	1	1	0	1	Bright Yellow
7	1	1	1	0	White	1	1	1	1	Bright White

- Some ZX Spectrum clones or NTSC machines might display "bright black" as dark gray.
- Colours simulated as sRGB assume non-bright as 85% voltage (0.55 V) and bright as 100% (0.65 V). Each ZX Spectrum model used different voltages, so the colours shown are only approximate.

=== IBM PC/XT and compatible systems ===
The original IBM PC launched in 1981 features an Intel 8088 CPU which has 8-bit data bus technology, though internally the CPU has a fully 16-bit architecture. It was offered with a Monochrome Display Adapter (MDA) or a Color Graphics Adapter (CGA). The MDA is a text mode-only display adapter, without any graphic ability beyond using the built-in code page 437 character set (which includes half-block and line-drawing characters), and employed an original IBM green monochrome monitor; only black, green and intensified green could be seen on its screen. Then, only the CGA had true graphic modes.

The IBM PC XT model, which succeeded the original PC in 1983, has an identical architecture and CPU to its predecessor, only with more expansion slots and a hard disk equipped as standard. The same two video cards, the MDA and the CGA, remained available for the PC XT, and no upgraded video hardware was offered by IBM until the EGA, which followed the introduction of the IBM Personal Computer/AT, with its full 16-bit bus design, in 1984.

==== CGA ====
The Color Graphics Adapter (CGA) outputs what IBM called "digital RGB" (that is, the R, G, B (and I) signals from the graphics card to the monitor can each only have two states: on or off).

CGA supports a maximum of 16 colors. However, its 320×200 graphics mode is restricted to fixed palettes containing only four colors, and the 640×200 graphic mode is only two colors. 16 simultaneous colors are only available in text mode or the "tweaked text" 160×100 mode.

A different set of 16 simultaneous colors is available using an NTSC TV or composite monitor by using artifact color techniques, with independent groups having demonstrated much larger color sets of over 256 colors See Color Graphics Adapter#High color depth.

The CGA RGBI palette is a variant of the 4-bit RGBI schema, arranged internally like this:.

CGA palette internal bit arrangement (4-bit RGBI)
Color	I	R	G	B	Color	I	R	G	B
Black	0	0	0	0	Gray 2	1	0	0	0
Blue	0	0	0	1	Light Blue	1	0	0	1
Green	0	0	1	0	Light Green	1	0	1	0
Cyan	0	0	1	1	Light Cyan	1	0	1	1
Red	0	1	0	0	Light Red	1	1	0	0
Magenta	0	1	0	1	Light Magenta	1	1	0	1
Yellow / Brown	0	1	1	0	Light Yellow	1	1	1	0
Gray 1	0	1	1	1	White	1	1	1	1

Although the RGBI signals each have only two states, the CGA color monitor (usually mentioned as RGB monitor) decodes them as four-level RGB signals. Darker colors are the basic RGB 2nd-level signals except for brown, which is dark yellow with the level for the green component halved (1st level). Brighter colors are made by adding a uniform intensity one-level signal to every RGB signal of the dark ones, reaching the 3rd-level (except dark gray which reaches only the 1st level), and in this case yellow is produced as if the brown were ordinary dark yellow.

The resulting displayed colors on RGB monitors are shown below:

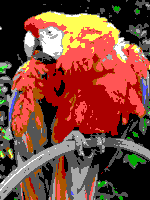

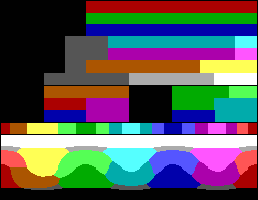

0 — black	8 — high gray
1 — low blue	9 — high blue
2 — low green	10 — high green
3 — low cyan	11 — high cyan
4 — low red	12 — high red
5 — low magenta	13 — high magenta
6 — low yellow (brown)	14 — high yellow
7 — low gray	15 — white

A few earlier non-IBM compatible CGA monitors lack the circuitry to decode color numbers as of four levels internally, and they cannot show brown and dark gray. The above palette is displayed in such monitors as follows:

0 — black	8 — black*
1 — low blue	9 — high blue
2 — low green	10 — high green
3 — low cyan	11 — high cyan
4 — low red	12 — high red
5 — low magenta	13 — high magenta
6 — low yellow* (brown)	14 — high yellow
7 — light gray* (gray)	15 — white

===== 16-color palette modes =====
The only full 16-color BIOS modes of the CGA are the text mode 0 (40×25) and mode 2 (80×25). Disabling the flashing attribute effect and using the IBM 437 codepage block characters 220 (DCh) ▄ (bottom half) or 223 (DFh) ▀ (upper half), the mode 2 screen buffer provides an 80×50 quasi-graphic mode.

Also, a tweak mode can be set in the CGA to give an extra, non-standard 160×100 pixels 16-color graphic mode.

16-color, 80×50 mode
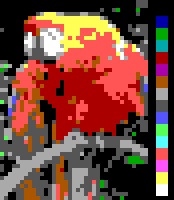
16-color, 160×100 mode
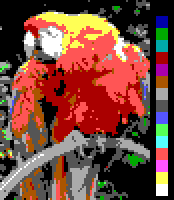
16-color comparison image

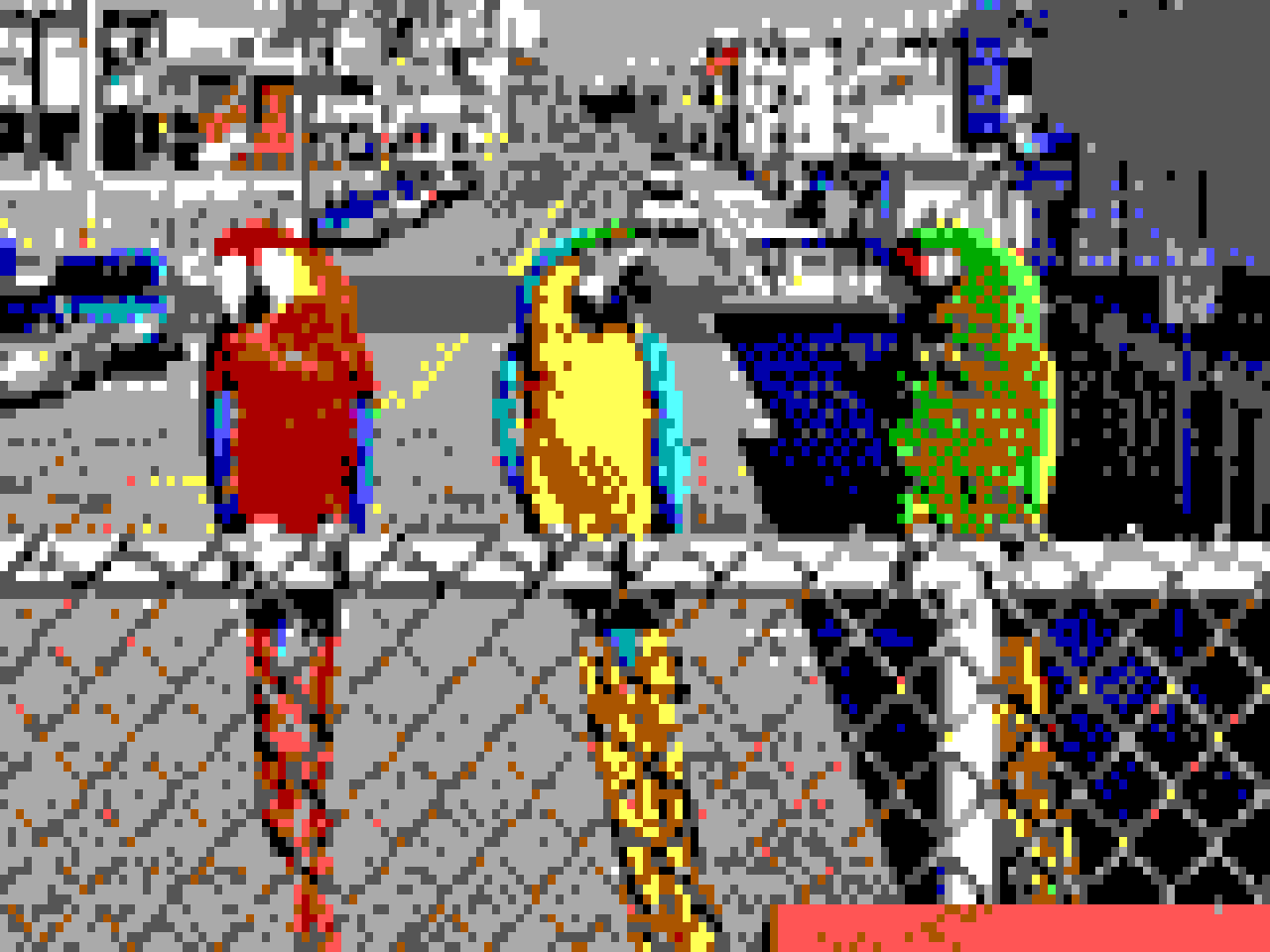

0	1	2	3	4	5	6	7
8	9	10	11	12	13	14	15

===== 4-color palette modes =====
In the 320×200 graphics mode, every pixel has two bits. A value of 0 is always a selectable background-plus-border color (with the same register and/or BIOS call used for the foreground color in the 640×200 graphic mode; black by default), and the three remaining values 1 to 3 are indices to one of the predefined color palette entries.

The selection of a palette is a bit complex. There are two BIOS 320×200 CGA graphics modes: modes 4 and 5. Mode 4 has the composite color burst output enabled (in the Mode Control Register at I/O address 3D8H, bit 2 is cleared), and mode 5 has it disabled (the same bit 2 is set). Mode 5 is intended mainly for a monochrome composite video monitor, but because of a specific intentional feature of the CGA hardware, it also has a different palette for an RGBI color monitor. For mode 4, two palettes can be chosen: green/red/brown and cyan/magenta/white; the difference is the absence or presence of the blue signal in all three colors. (The palette is selected with bit 5 of the Color-Select Register at I/O address 3D9h, where the bit value 1 selects the cyan/magenta/white palette [a/k/a "palette #1" because it is the BIOS default] and 0 selects the green/red/brown palette [a/k/a "palette #2"]. This bit can be set using BIOS INT 10h function 0Bh, subfunction 1.) The palette for BIOS video mode 5 is always cyan/red/white: blue is always on, and red and green each are controlled directly by one of the two bits of the pixel color value. For each of these three palette options, a low or high intensity palette can be chosen with bit 4 of the aforementioned Color-Select Register: a value of 0 means low intensity and 1 means high intensity. (No BIOS call exists to switch between the two intensity modes.) The selected intensity setting simply controls the "I" output signal to the RGBI monitor for all colors in the palette. As a result, the green-red-brown palette appears as bright-green/bright-red/yellow when high intensity is selected. The combination of color-burst enable/disable selection, palette selection, and intensity selection yields a total of 6 different possible palettes for CGA 320×200 graphics.

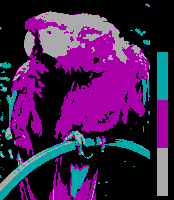

====== Mode 4, palette #1, low intensity ======
0 — [user-defined]
1 — cyan
2 — magenta
3 — light grey

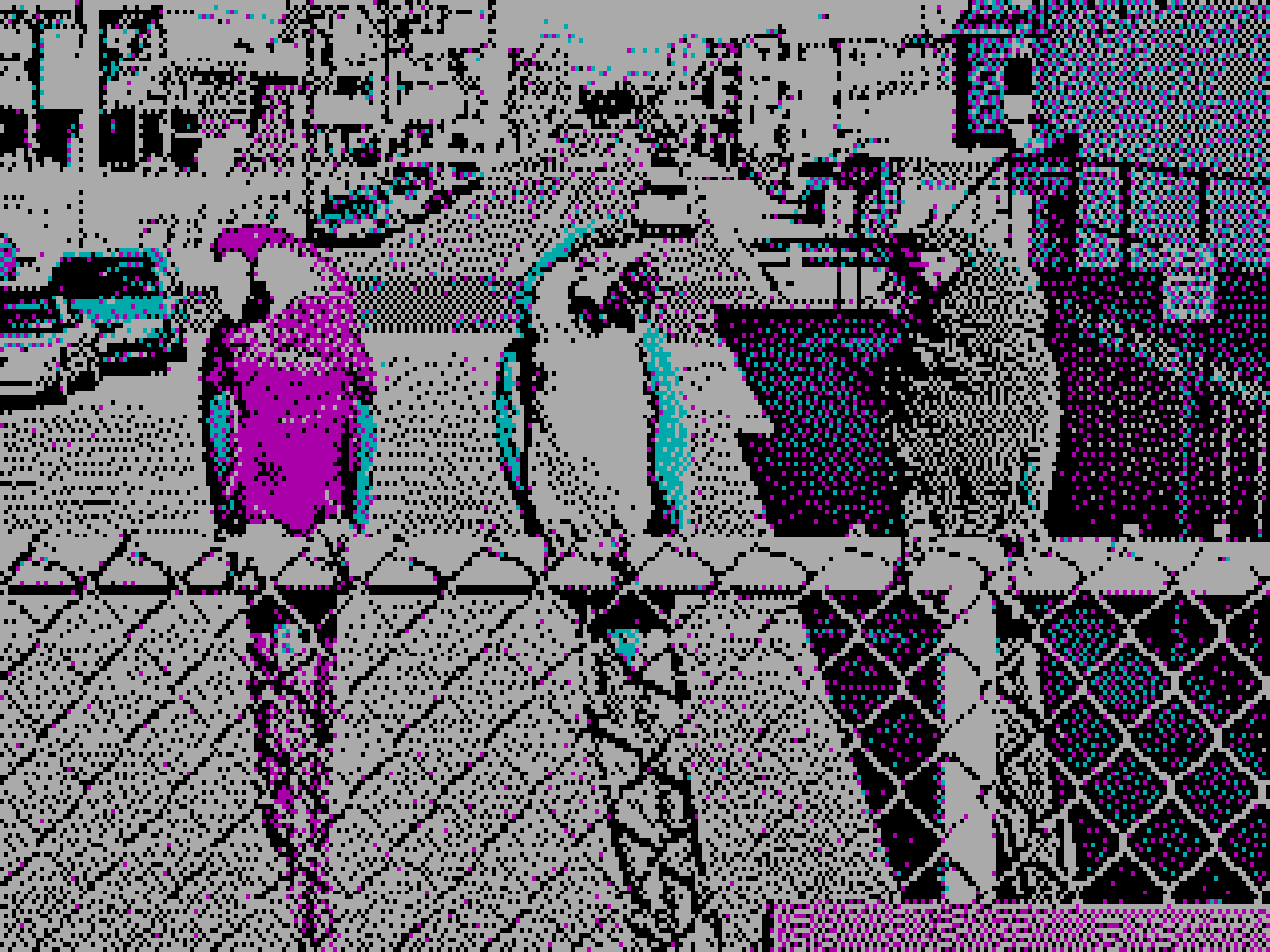

The sixteen combinations with the background color are:

0	1	_	0	1	_	0	1	_	0	1	*	0	1	_	0	1	*	0	1	_	0	1	*
2	3	_	2	3	_	2	3	_	2	3	_	2	3	_	2	3	_	2	3	_	2	3	_

0	1	_	0	1	_	0	1	_	0	1	_	0	1	_	0	1	_	0	1	_	0	1	_
2	3	_	2	3	_	2	3	_	2	3	_	2	3	_	2	3	_	2	3	_	2	3	_

(*) Useless due to the duplication of one of the colors.

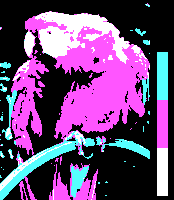

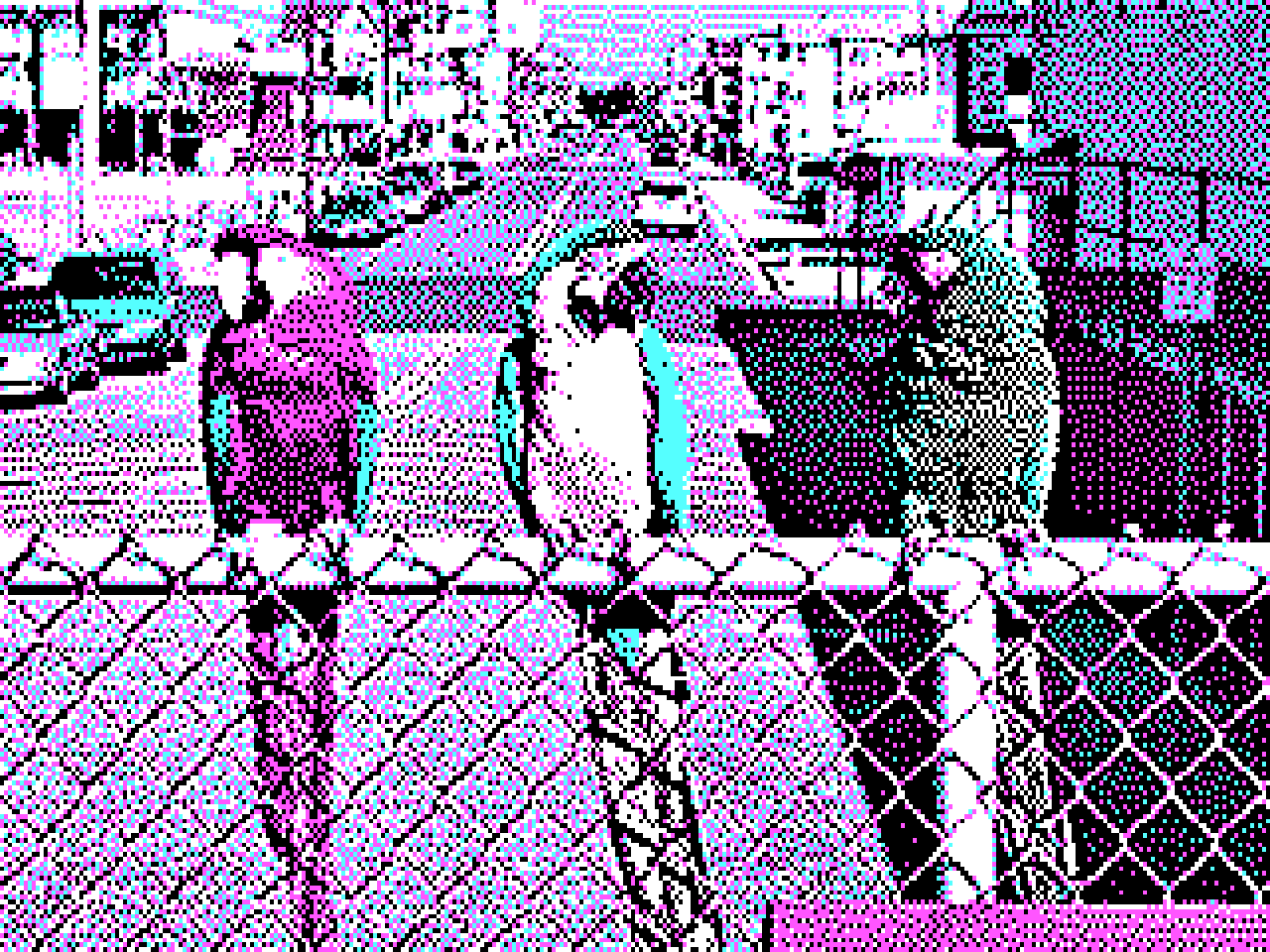

====== Mode 4, palette #1, high intensity ======
0 — [user-defined]
1 — bright cyan
2 — bright magenta
3 — bright white

The sixteen combinations with the background color are:

0	1	_	0	1	_	0	1	_	0	1	_	0	1	_	0	1	_	0	1	_	0	1	_
2	3	_	2	3	_	2	3	_	2	3	_	2	3	_	2	3	_	2	3	_	2	3	_

0	1	_	0	1	_	0	1	_	0	1	*	0	1	_	0	1	*	0	1	_	0	1	*
2	3	_	2	3	_	2	3	_	2	3	_	2	3	_	2	3	_	2	3	_	2	3	_

(*) Useless due to the duplication of one of the colors.

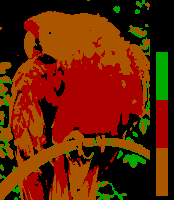

====== Mode 4, palette #2, low intensity ======
0 — [user-defined]
1 — green
2 — red
3 — brown

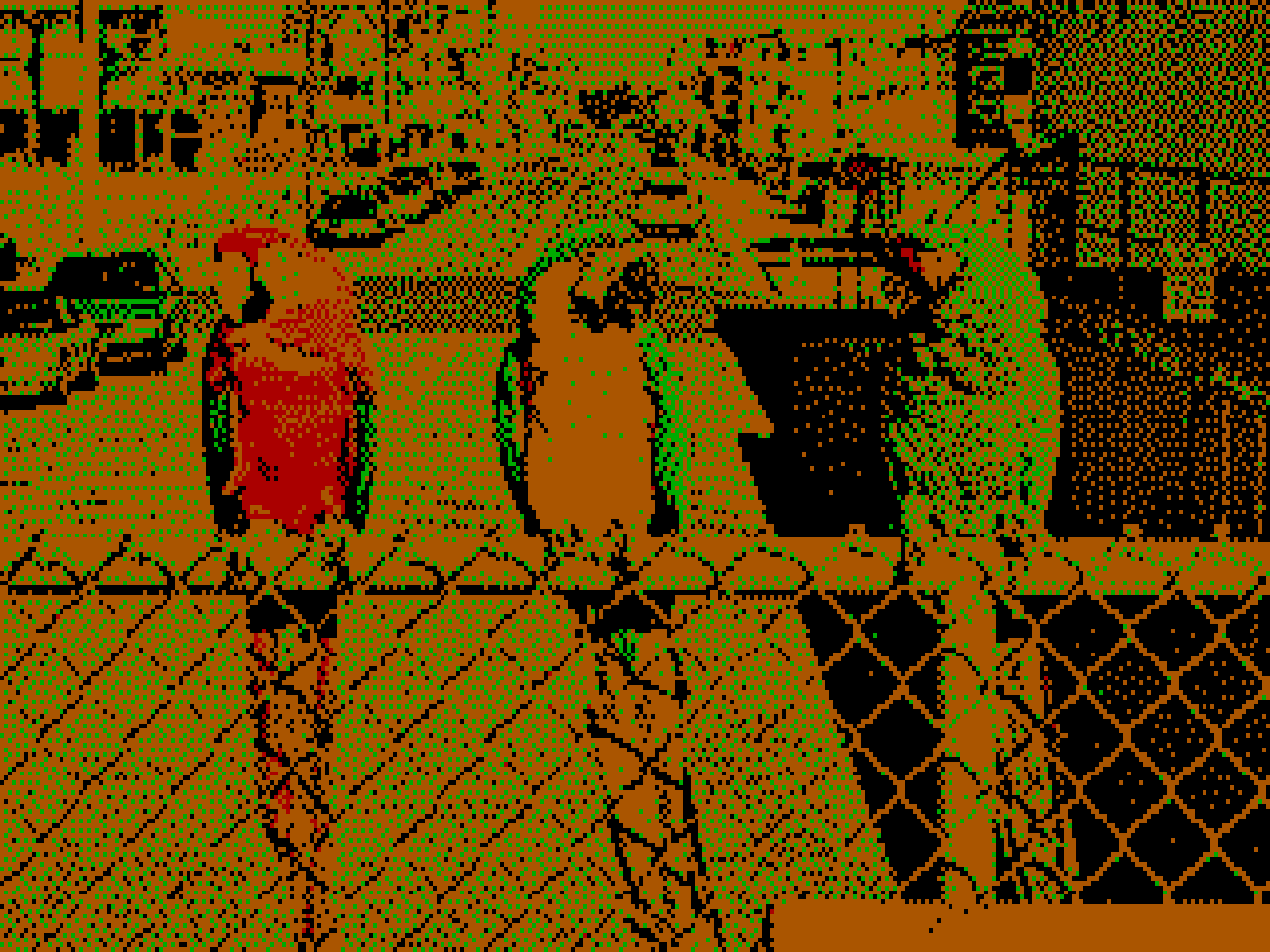

The sixteen combinations with the background color are:

0	1	_	0	1	_	0	1	*	0	1	_	0	1	*	0	1	_	0	1	*	0	1	_
2	3	_	2	3	_	2	3	_	2	3	_	2	3	_	2	3	_	2	3	_	2	3	_

0	1	_	0	1	_	0	1	_	0	1	_	0	1	_	0	1	_	0	1	_	0	1	_
2	3	_	2	3	_	2	3	_	2	3	_	2	3	_	2	3	_	2	3	_	2	3	_

(*) Useless due to the duplication of one of the colors.

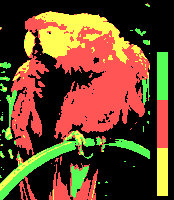

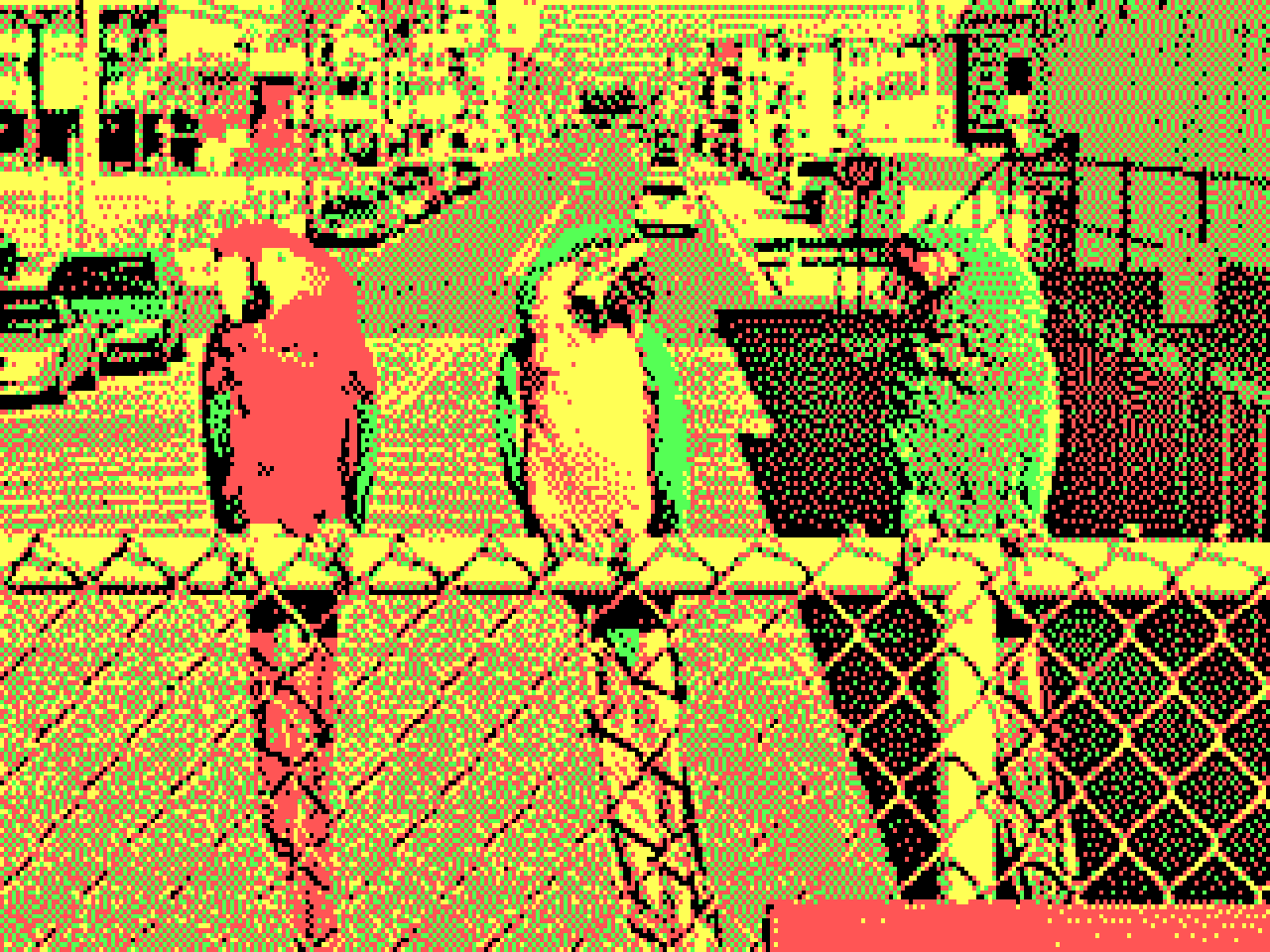

====== Mode 4, palette #2, high intensity ======
0 — [user-defined]
1 — bright green
2 — bright red
3 — yellow

The sixteen combinations with the background color are:

0	1	_	0	1	_	0	1	_	0	1	_	0	1	_	0	1	_	0	1	_	0	1	_
2	3	_	2	3	_	2	3	_	2	3	_	2	3	_	2	3	_	2	3	_	2	3	_

0	1	_	0	1	_	0	1	*	0	1	_	0	1	*	0	1	_	0	1	*	0	1	_
2	3	_	2	3	_	2	3	_	2	3	_	2	3	_	2	3	_	2	3	_	2	3	_

(*) Useless due to the duplication of one of the colors.

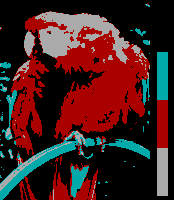

====== Mode 5, low intensity ======
0 — [user-defined]
1 — cyan
2 — red
3 — light grey

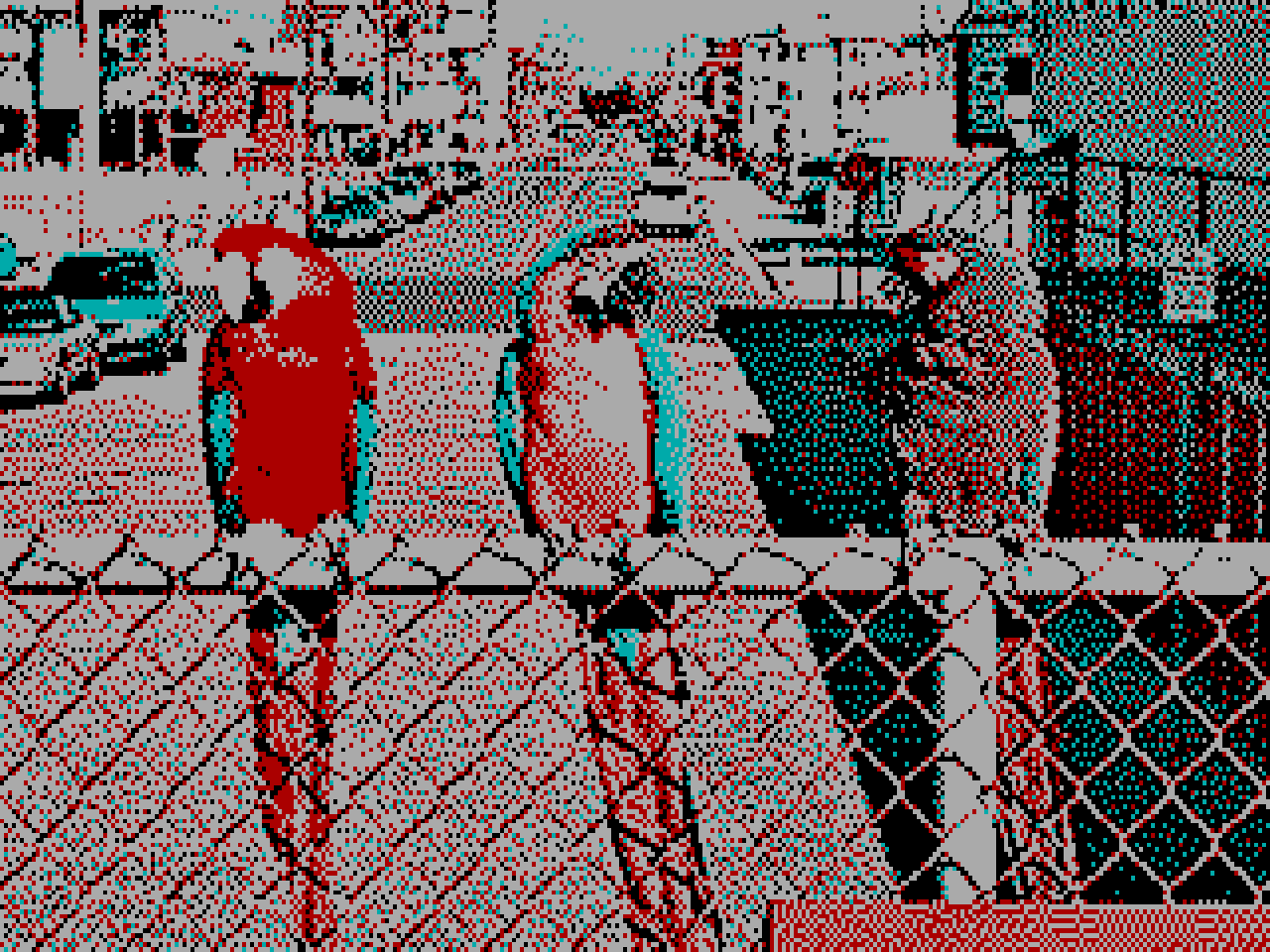

The sixteen combinations with the background color are:

0	1	_	0	1	_	0	1	_	0	1	*	0	1	*	0	1	_	0	1	_	0	1	*
2	3	_	2	3	_	2	3	_	2	3	_	2	3	_	2	3	_	2	3	_	2	3	_

0	1	_	0	1	_	0	1	_	0	1	_	0	1	_	0	1	_	0	1	_	0	1	_
2	3	_	2	3	_	2	3	_	2	3	_	2	3	_	2	3	_	2	3	_	2	3	_

(*) Useless due to the duplication of one of the colors.

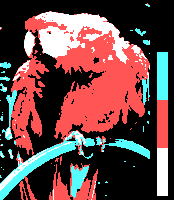

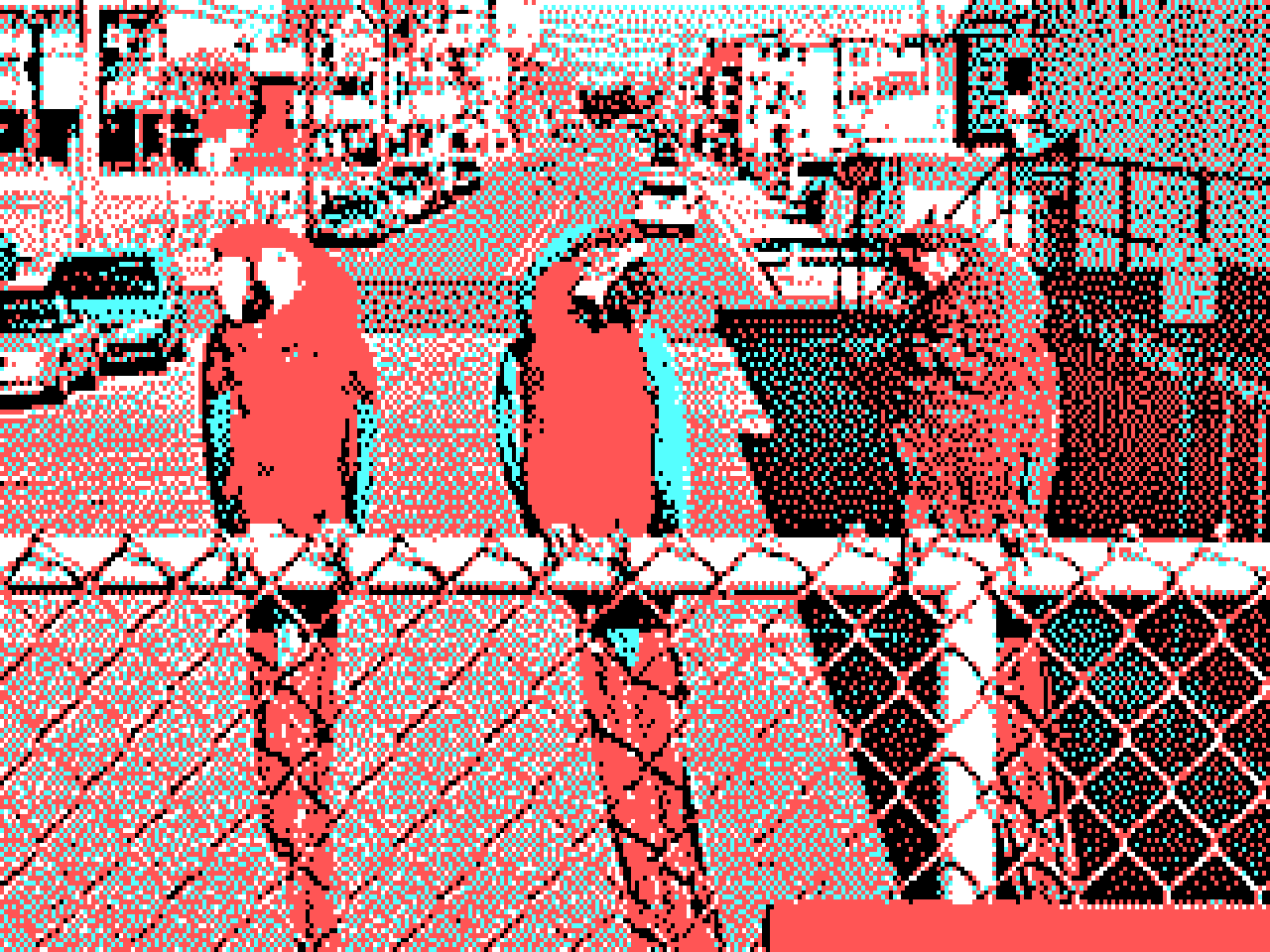

====== Mode 5, high intensity ======
0 — [user-defined]
1 — bright cyan
2 — bright red
3 — white

The sixteen combinations with the background color are:

0	1	_	0	1	_	0	1	_	0	1	_	0	1	_	0	1	_	0	1	_	0	1	_
2	3	_	2	3	_	2	3	_	2	3	_	2	3	_	2	3	_	2	3	_	2	3	_

0	1	_	0	1	_	0	1	_	0	1	*	0	1	*	0	1	_	0	1	_	0	1	*
2	3	_	2	3	_	2	3	_	2	3	_	2	3	_	2	3	_	2	3	_	2	3	_

(*) Useless due to the duplication of one of the colors.

When viewed in a monochrome composite monitor, the mode 5 palettes above are shown as a (more or less brighter) 2-bit grayscale palette:

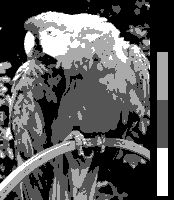

===== 2-color palette mode =====
In the 640×200 graphic mode (BIOS mode number 6), every pixel has only a single bit. The foreground color can be set, with the default being white.

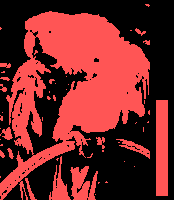
2-color

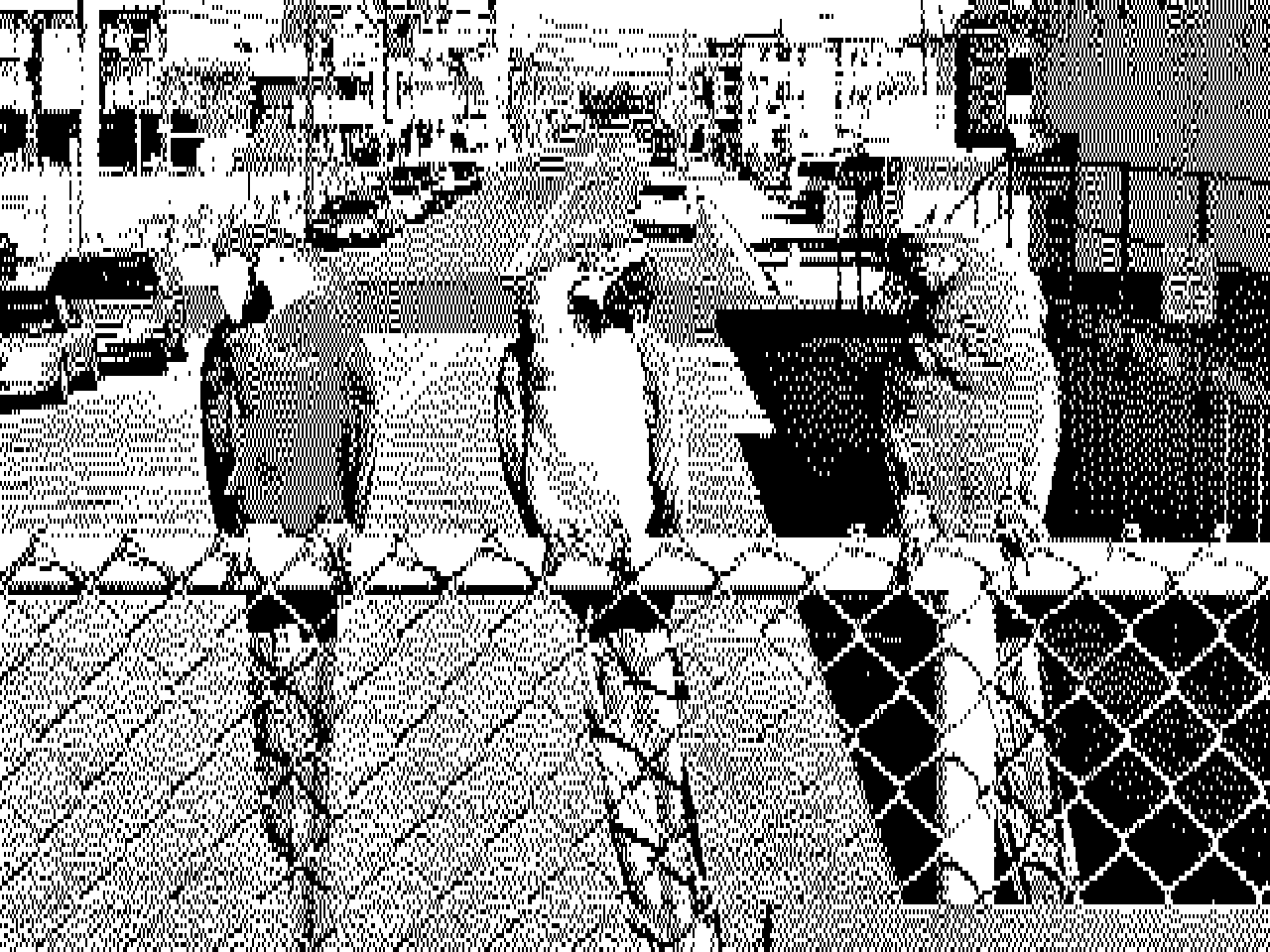
2-color comparison image

0 — black
1 — [user-defined]

The sixteen combinations are:

0	1	_	0	1	_	0	1	_	0	1	_	0	1	_	0	1	_	0	1	_	0	1	_

0	1	_	0	1	_	0	1	_	0	1	_	0	1	_	0	1	_	0	1	_	0	1	_

==== PCjr and Tandy 1000 series ====
The IBM PCjr features a "CGA Plus" video subsystem, consisting mainly of a 6845 CRTC and an LSI video chip known as the "Video Gate Array", that can show all 16 CGA colors simultaneously on screen in the extended low-res graphic modes. The near-compatible Tandy 1000 series features almost 100% PCjr-compatible video hardware implemented in a Tandy proprietary chip. This graphics adapter is better known by the name Tandy Graphics Adapter, because the PCjr was short-lived but the Tandy 1000 line was quite popular for many years. The video mode capabilities of early-model Tandy 1000 computers are exactly the same as the PCjr's. (Later Tandy 1000 models featured "Tandy Video II" hardware which added a 640×200 16-color mode but surrendered PCjr hardware register-compatibility for CGA register-compatibility.)

The PCjr adds three video modes to the CGA mode set: 160×200 16-color "low-resolution" graphics, 320×200 16-color "medium-resolution" graphics, and 640×200 4-color "high-resolution" graphics. All PCjr/Tandy 1000 graphics modes can reassign any color index to any palette entry making all 16 colors freely selectable in modes with fewer than 16 colors (including the plain CGA modes) and making color cycling effects possible in all modes. The PCjr also offers a graphics blink function which causes 8 colors to alternate between the low and high halves of the 16-color palette at the text blink rate. (A PCjr must be upgraded with a PCjr-specific internal 64 KB memory expansion card in order to use the latter two of these modes or any 80-column text mode. Tandy 1000 base models can use all video modes.)

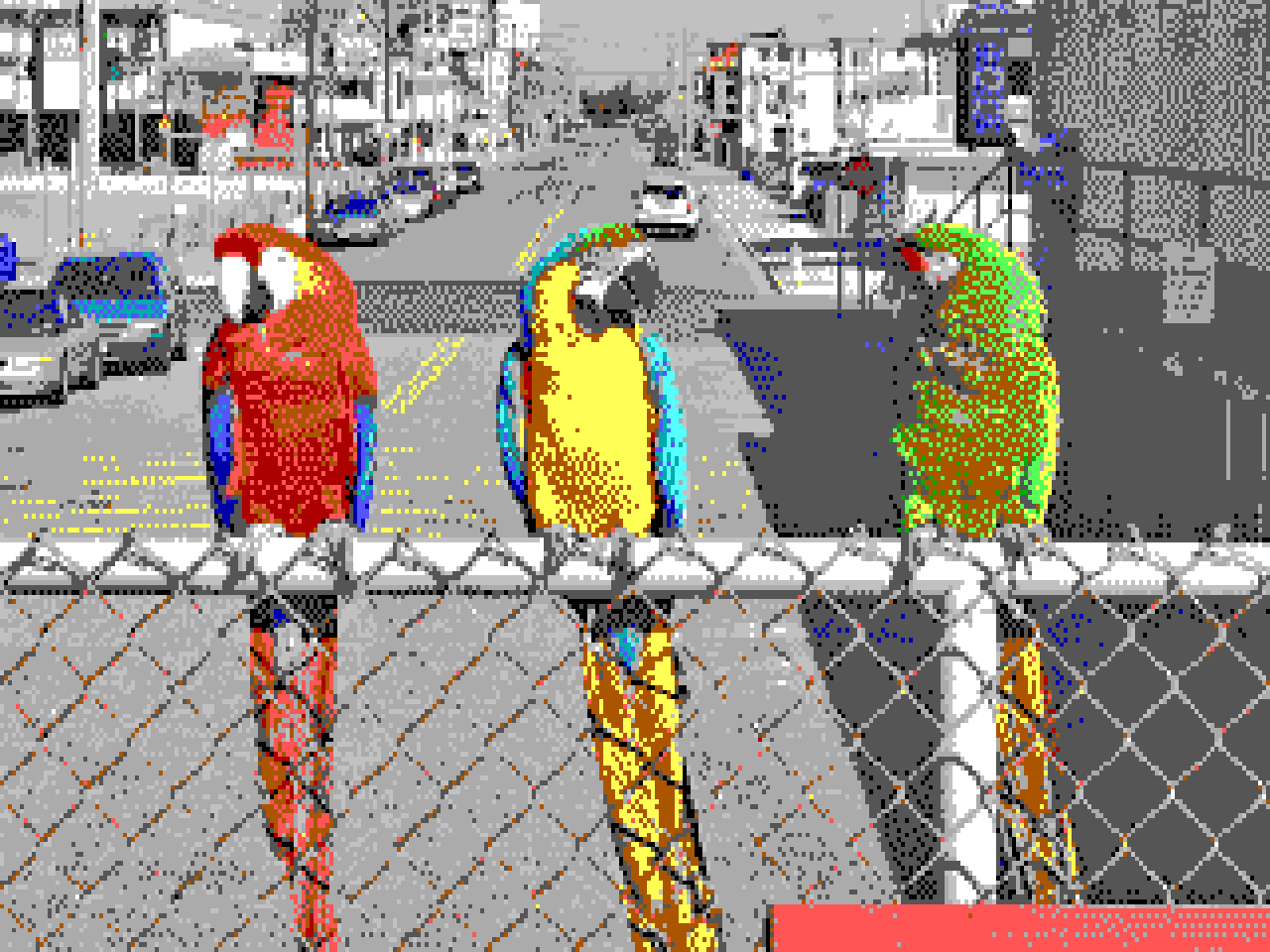
320 × 200 16-color comparison image

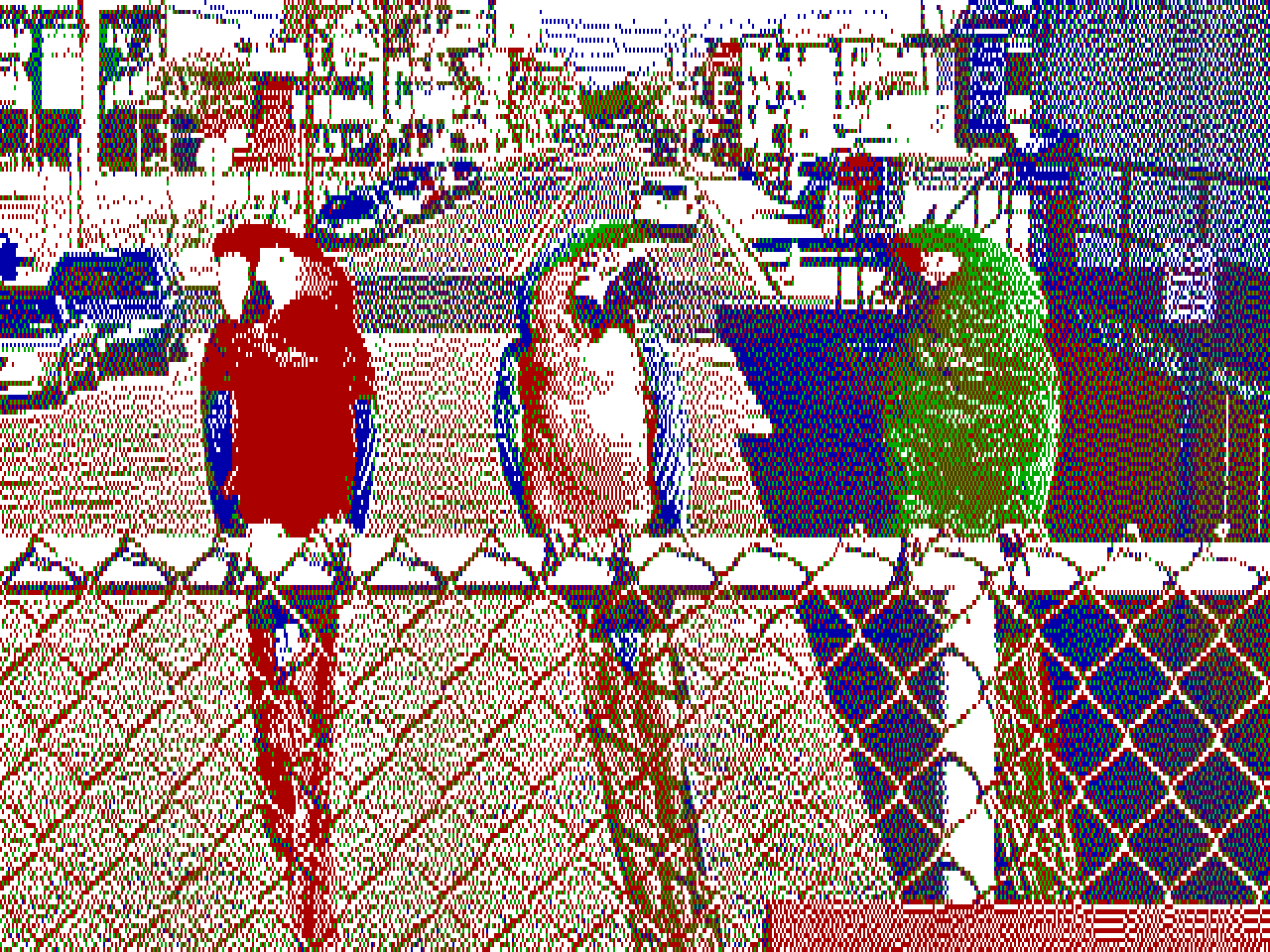
640 × 200 4-color comparison image

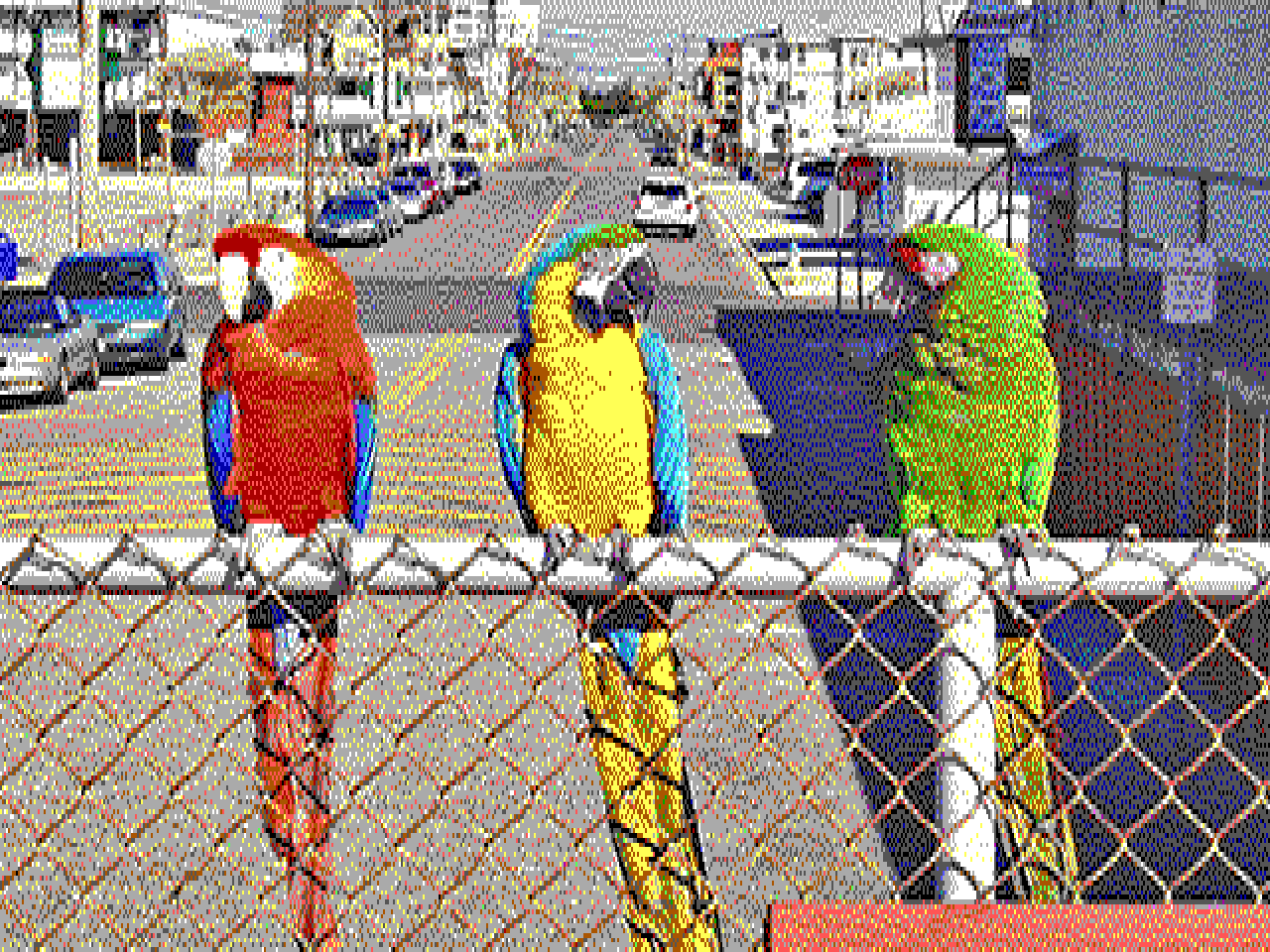
640 × 200 16-color comparison image

=== Thomson ===
For Thomson computers, a popular brand in France, the most common display modes are 320×200, with 8×1 attribute cells with 2 colors. Here the intensity byte affects saturation and not only brightness variations.

==== Thomson MO5 ====
The Thomson MO5 generated graphics based on a EFGJ03L (or MA4Q-1200) gate array capable of 40×25 text display and a resolution of 320 x 200 pixels with 16 colours (subject to proximity constraints – only two colors for a 8x1 pixel area).

The colour palette has 8 basic RGB colours with an intensity bit (called P for "Pastel") that controlled saturation ("saturated" or "pastel"). In memory, the bit order was PBGR. The desaturated colours were obtained by mixing of the original RGB components within the video hardware. This is done by a PROM circuit, where a two-bit mask controls colour mixing ratios of 0%, 33%, 66% and 100% of the saturated hue. This approach makes it easy break from the usual logical progression and substitute any color in any place. This was done to replace "desaturated white" with Orange and "desaturated black" with Gray.

According to the values specified on the computer's technical manual (“Manuel Technique du MO5”, pg. 11 & 19), the hardware palette was:

Thomson MO5 Hardware Palette
Memory bits PBGR	PROM bit mask B2B1 G2G1 R2R1	Name	Memory bits PBGR	PROM bit mask B2B1 G2G1 R2R1	Name
0000	00 00 00	Black	1000	10 10 10	Gray
0001	01 01 11	Red	1001	10 10 11	Rose
0010	00 11 00	Green	1010	10 11 10	Light Green
0011	00 11 11	Yellow	1011	10 11 11	Light Yellow
0100	11 01 01	Blue	1100	11 10 01	Light Blue
0101	11 00 11	Magenta	1101	11 10 11	Parma Pink
0110	11 11 01	Cyan	1110	11 11 10	Light Cyan
0111	11 11 11	White	1111	01 10 11	Orange

Displayed colors are only approximate due to different transfer and color spaces used on web pages (sRGB) and analog video (BT.601)

Actual colour on emulators and later models seems to have been tweaked, with normal Blue and Red being fully saturated.

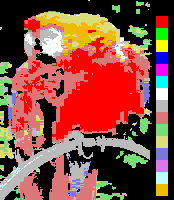
Simulated image

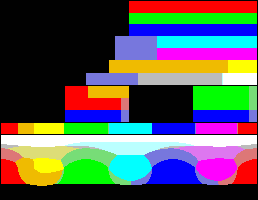
Color test chart

==== Thomson TO7/70 ====
The Thomson TO7/70 graphics were similar to the Thomson MO5 and generated by a Motorola MCA1300 gate array. capable of 40×25 text display and a resolution of 320 x 200 pixels with 16 colours (limited by 8x1 pixel colour attribute areas). The colour palette is 4-bit RGBI, with 8 basic RGB colours and a intensity bit (called P for "Pastel") that controlled saturation ("saturated" or "pastel").

Fixed color palette 1 (similar to MO5)

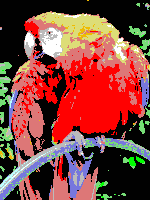
Sample image

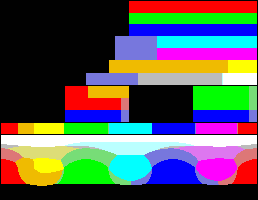
Color test chart

0x0 K	0x1 B	0x2 R	0x3 M	0x4 G	0x5 C	0x6 Y	0x7 W
0x8	0x9	0xA	0xB	0xC	0xD	0xE	0xF

Fixed color palette 2

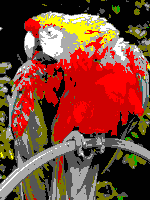

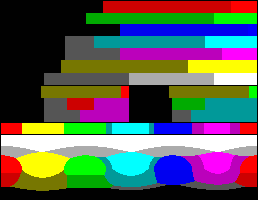

0x0	0x1	0x2	0x3	0x4	0x5	0x6	0x7
0x8	0x9	0xA	0xB	0xC	0xD	0xE	0xF

Fixed color palette 3

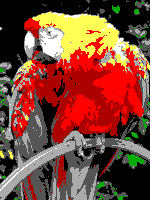

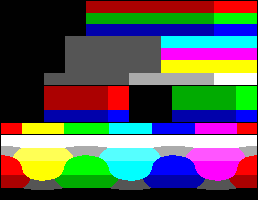

Example of 16 fixed color palette 3
0x0	0x1	0x2	0x3	0x4	0x5	0x6	0x7
0x8	0x9	0xA	0xB	0xC	0xD	0xE	0xF

=== Mattel Aquarius ===
The Mattel Aquarius computer has a text mode with 40×24 characters, that can be used as a semigraphic 80×72 low-resolution graphics mode. There are spatial constraints ("attribute" areas) for different colors, consisting of 2×3 pixel groups.

The machine uses a TEA1002 graphic chip, and there are three bits for the RGB components (generating 8 primary colors at full saturation but 75% luminance - similar to the EBU colour bars) and an intensity bit that controls a variation of the base color (a 75% luminance decrease for white, creating gray; a 50% chroma saturation decrease for the RGB primary colors).

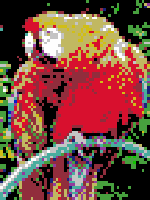

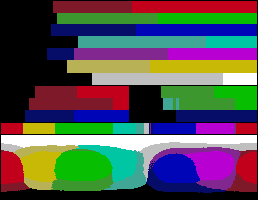

The following table lists the internal signals and shows an approximation of the generated colors, as seen on a web standard sRGB monitor. Colors could be different when seen on an analog PAL CRT television.

TEA1002 Logic inputs and composite video output (configured for 75% EBU colour bars)
Color	R	G	B	INV	Luminance (%)	Chroma (º)	Chroma (%)
Black	0	0	0	0	0.0	-	-
Red	1	0	0	0	22.5	103	±48
Green	0	1	0	0	44.0	241	±44
Yellow	1	1	0	0	66.5	167	±33
Blue	0	0	1	0	8.5	347	±33
Magenta	1	0	1	0	31.0	61	±44
Cyan	0	1	1	0	52.5	283	±48
White	1	1	1	0	100.0	-	-
Grey	0	0	0	1	75.0	-	-
Cyan	1	0	0	1	52.5	283	±24
Magenta	0	1	0	1	31.0	61	±22
Blue	1	1	0	1	8.5	347	±17
Yellow	0	0	1	1	66.5	167	±17
Green	1	0	0	1	44.0	241	±22
Red	0	1	1	1	22.5	103	±24
Black	1	1	1	1	0.0	-	-

An alternate configuration of the chip allows it to output 95% luminance color bars – similar to BBC colour bars, more suited for usage in teletext decoders.

TEA1002 Logic inputs and composite video output (configured for 95% BBC colour bars)
Color	R	G	B	INV	Luminance (%)	Chroma (º)	Chroma (%)
Black	0	0	0	0	0.0	-	-
Red	1	0	0	0	47.5	103	±48
Green	0	1	0	0	69	241	±44
Yellow	1	1	0	0	91.5	167	±33
Blue	0	0	1	0	33.5	347	±33
Magenta	1	0	0	0	56	61	±44
Cyan	0	1	1	0	77.5	283	±48
White	1	1	1	0	100.0	-	-
Grey	0	0	0	1	100.0	-	-
Cyan	1	0	0	1	77.5	283	±24
Magenta	0	1	0	1	56	61	±22
Blue	1	1	0	1	33.5	347	±17
Yellow	0	0	1	1	91.5	167	±17
Green	1	0	0	1	69	241	±22
Red	0	1	1	1	47.5	103	±24
Black	1	1	1	1	0.0	-	-

== 3-level RGB palettes ==
A 3-level, or 1-trit (not 3 bits) RGB palette uses three levels for every red, green and blue color component, resulting in a 3^{3} = 27 colors as follows:

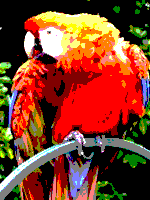

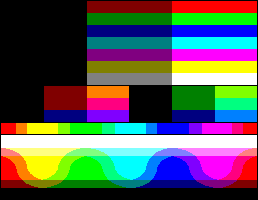

=== Amstrad CPC series ===
The Amstrad CPC 464/664/6128 uses a 3-level palette of 27 colours, from which 16 can be simultaneously displayed in low-resolution mode, four in medium resolution mode and two in high-resolution mode.

Simulations of actual images on the Amstrad's colour monitor in each of the modes (160×200×16 colours; 320×200x4 colours and 640×200×2 colours) follows. A cheaper green monochrome display was also available from the manufacturer; in this case, the colours are viewed as a 16-tone green scale, as shown in the last simulated image, as it interprets the overall brightness of the full colour signal, instead of only considering the green intensity as might, e.g., the Philips CM8833 line.

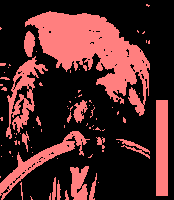
2 colours

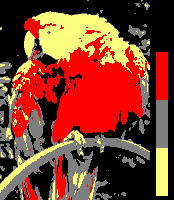
4 colours

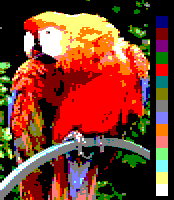
16 colours

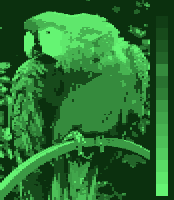
16-tone green scale

0 – Black (5)	1 – Dark blue (0,14)	2 – Blue (6)	3 – Dark red	4 – Dark magenta	5 – Violet	6 – Red (3)	7 – Magenta-red	8 – Magenta (7)
9 – Dark green	10 – Dark cyan (8)	11 – Cyan-blue (15)	12 – Dark yellow (brown) (9)	13 – Grey	14 – Light blue (10)	15 – Orange	16 – Pink (11, 15)	17 – Light magenta
18 – Green (12)	19 – Cyan-green	20 – Cyan (2)	21 – Yellow-green	22 – Light green (13)	23 – Light cyan	24 – Yellow (1, 14)	25 – Light yellow	26 – White (4)

The number in parentheses means the primary ink number for the Locomotive BASIC PEN, PAPER and INK statements (that is, "(1)" means ink #1 defaults to this colour). Inks can also have a secondary colour number, meaning they flash between two colours. By default, ink #14 alternates between colours 1 and 24 (blue and bright yellow) and ink #15 alternates between colours 11 and 16 (cyan-blue and pink). In addition, the paper defaults to ink #0 and the pen to ink #1, meaning yellow text on a dark blue background.

== 6-bit RGB palettes ==
The 6-bit RGB palette uses 2 bits for each RGB component. This results in an 4×4×4 = 64-colour palette as follows:

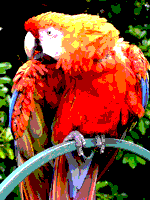

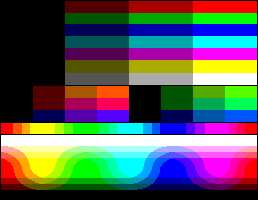

=== Tandy Color Computer 3 ===
The Tandy Color Computer 3 could display all of the modes of the Tandy Color Computer 1 and 2 / TRS-80 Color Computer, except the Semigraphics modes. Taking the place of the graphics and memory hardware of the previous machines is an application-specific integrated circuit called (officially) the Advanced Color Video Chip (ACVC) or (unofficially) the Graphics Interrupt Memory Enhancer (GIME).

With colors from a palette of 64 possible colors, this chip is capable of displaying the following combinations of colors and resolutions: 320x192x4, 320x192x16, 640x192x2, and 640x192x4. There are two palette modes: RGB and Composite. Both modes use a six-bit arrangement. In RGB mode, there are four levels of intensity for each color channel.

Tandy Color Computer 3 RGB color palette value bits
Bit 5	Bit 4	Bit 3	Bit 2	Bit 1	Bit 0
Red 1	Green 1	Blue 1	Red 0	Green 0	Blue 0

== 8-bit RGB palettes ==
The 8-bit RGB palette (also known as 3-3-2 bit RGB) uses 3 bits for each of the red and green color components, and 2 bits for the blue component, due to the lesser sensitivity of the common human eye to this primary color. This results in an 8×8×4 = 256-color palette as follows:

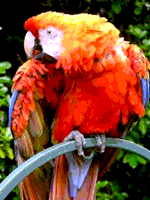

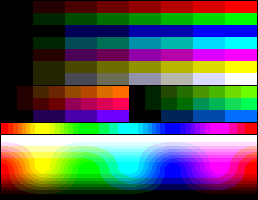

Red	#000000	#240000	#490000	#6D0000	#920000	#B60000	#DB0000	#FF0000
Green	#000000	#002400	#004900	#006D00	#009200	#00B600	#00DB00	#00FF00
Blue	#000000		#000055		#0000AA		#0000FF	

=== Tiki 100 ===
The Tiki 100 uses an 8-bit RGB palette (also described as 3-3-2 bit RGB), with 3 bits for each of the red and green color components, and 2 bits for the blue component. It supports 3 different resolutions with 256, 512 or 1024 by 256 pixels and 16, 4, or 2 colors respectively (freely selectable from the full 256-color palette).

=== Enterprise ===
The Enterprise computer has five graphics modes: 40- and 80-column text modes, Lo-Res and Hi-Res bit-mapped graphics, and attribute graphics. Bit-mapped graphics modes can display 2, 4, 16, or 256 colors (from a 3-3-2 bit RGB palette), but horizontal resolution decreases as color depth increases.

Interlaced and non-interlaced modes are available. The maximum resolution is 640×512 pixels interlaced, or 640×256 pixels non-interlaced. Only 2 colors are available at these resolutions.

A 256-color display has a maximum resolution of 80×256. The attribute graphics mode provides a 320×256 pixel resolution with 16 colors selected from a palette of 256.

Multiple pages can be displayed simultaneously on the screen – even if their graphics modes are different. Each page has its own palette which makes it possible to display more colors on screen simultaneously. The page height can be larger than the screen or the window it is displayed on. Each page is connected to a channel of the EXOS operating system, so it is possible to write on a hidden page.

=== MSX2 ===
On the MSX2 screen mode 8 is a high-resolution 256×212-pixel mode with an 8-bit color depth, giving a palette of 256 colors (Fixed RGB mode of the Yamaha V9938 video chip). From the MSB to LSB, there are three green bits, three red bits, and two blue bits. This mode uses half of the available colors overall, and can be considered a palette in its own right.

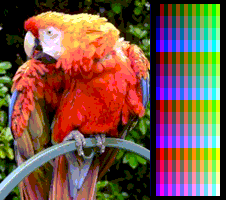

== 9-bit RGB palettes ==
The 9-bit RGB palette uses 3 bits for each of the red, green, and blue color components. This results in a (2^{3})^{3} = 8^{3} = 512-color palette as follows:

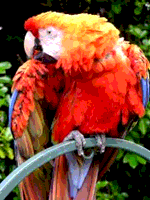

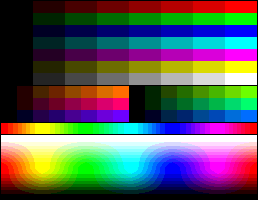

=== MSX2 ===
The MSX2 series features a Yamaha V9938 video chip, which manages a 9-bit RGB palette (512 colors in Paletted RGB mode) and has some extended graphic modes. Although its graphical capabilities are similar, or even better than of those of 16-bit personal computers, MSX2 and MSX2+ (see below) are pure 8-bit machines.

Screen mode 6 is a 512×212-pixel mode with a 4-color palette chosen from the available 512 colors. Screen modes 5 and 7 are high-resolution 256×212-pixel and 512×212-pixel modes, respectively, with a 16-color palette chosen from the available 512 colors. Each pixel can be any of the 16 selected colors.

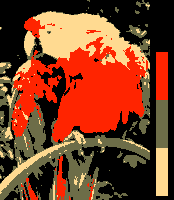
4-color screen mode 6

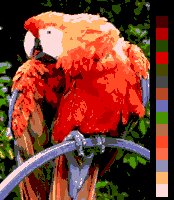
16-color screen mode 5

== 15-bit RGB palettes ==
The 15-bit RGB palette uses 5 bits for each of the red, green, and blue color components. This results in a (2^{5})^{3} = 32^{3} = 32,768-color palette (commonly known as Highcolor).

=== MSX2+ ===
The MSX2+ series (released in 1988) features a Yamaha V9958 video chip which manages a 15-bit RGB palette internally encoded in YJK (up to 19,268 different colors from the 32,768 theoretically possible) and has additional screen modes. Although its graphical capabilities are similar, or even better than of those of 16-bit personal computers, MSX2 (see above) and MSX2+ are pure 8-bit machines. YJK color encoding can be viewed as a lossy compression technique; in the RGB to YJK conversion, the average red and green levels are preserved, but blue is subsampled. As a result of every four pixels sharing a chroma value, in mode 12 it is not possible to have vertical lines of a single color. This is only possible in modes 10 and 11 due to the additional 16-color direct palette. This can be used to mix 16 indexed colors with a rich colorful background, in what can be considered a primitive video overlay technique.

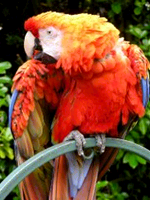

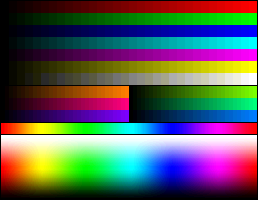

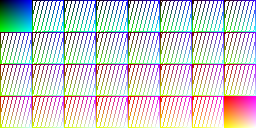

Screen modes 10 & 11 – 12,499 YJK colors plus a 16-color palette. In this mode, the YJK technique encodes 16 levels of luminance into the four LSBs of each pixel and 64 levels of chroma, from −32 to +31, shared across every four consecutive pixels and stored in the three higher bits of the four pixels. If the fifth bit of the pixel is set, then the lower four bits of the pixel points to an index in the 16-color palette; otherwise, they specify the YJK luminance level of the pixel.

Screen mode 12 is similar to modes 10 and 11, but uses five bits to encode 32 levels of luminance for every pixel, thus it does not use an additional palette and, with YJK encoding, 19,268 different colors can be displayed simultaneously with 8-bit color depth.

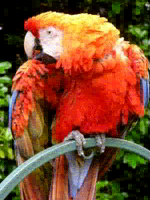
Screen mode 10 & 11

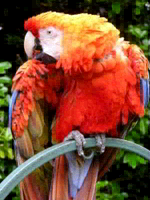
Screen mode 12

== 18-bit RGB palettes ==
A 18-bit RGB palette uses 6 bits for each of the red, green, and blue color components. This results in a (2^{6})^{3} = 64^{3} = 262,144-color palette as follows:

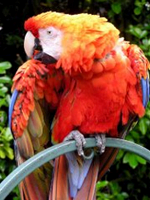

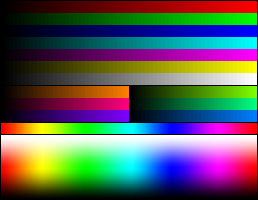

=== FM-77 AV 40 ===
Fujitsu's FM-77 AV 40, released in 1986, uses an 18-bit RGB palette. Any 64,000 out of 262,144 colors can be displayed simultaneously at the 320×200 resolution, or 8 out of 262,144 colors at the 640×400 resolution.

== Composite video palettes ==
This section covers systems that generate color directly as composite video, closely related with display on analog CRT TVs. Many of the colors are non-standard and outside of RGB gamut, and would only display properly on NTSC hardware. Due to the varying ways of converting a composite signal to sRGB (the standard for internet images), images in this section will be inconsistent with each other in color until further notice.

=== Atari 8-bit computers ===
Early models of the Atari 400 and 800 use a palette of 128 colors, using 4 bits for chrominance and 3 for luminance. Screen modes may vary from 320×192 (384×240 with overscan) to 40×24, using 2 or 4 simultaneous colors, or 80×192 (96×240 with overscan) using 16 colors. After 2 years (late 1981) the CTIA graphics chip was replaced with the GTIA chip increasing the palette to 256 colors (CTIA and GTIA).

The ANTIC chip has an instruction set to run programs (called display lists) which permits many more colors on the screen at once. There are a number of possible software-driven graphics modes.

==== CTIA palette ====
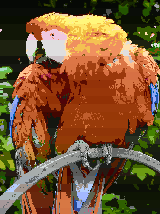

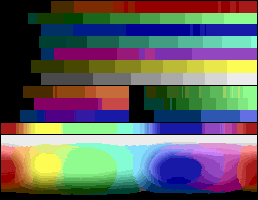

luminance hue	0	2	4	6	8	10	12	14
0								
1								
2								
3								
4								
5								
6								
7								
8								
9								
10								
11								
12								
13								
14								
15								

==== GTIA palette ====
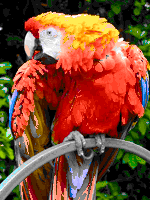

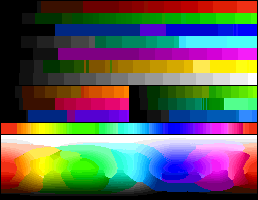

luminance hue	0	1	2	3	4	5	6	7	8	9	10	11	12	13	14	15
0																
1																
2																
3																
4																
5																
6																
7																
8																
9																
10																
11																
12																
13																
14																
15																

=== Apple II ===
The Apple II has a 16-color composite video palette, based on the YIQ color space used by the NTSC color TV system.

Low-res mode palette

The 40x48 pixel low-resolution mode has 15 different colors plus a duplicate gray.

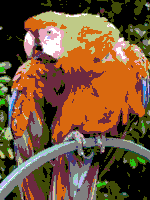

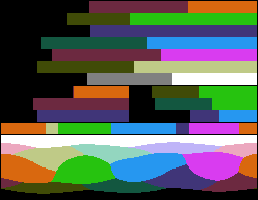

Apple II Lo-Res colors and YIQ values
Number	Name	YIQ			Number	Name	YIQ		
Number	Name	Y	I	Q	Number	Name	Y	I	Q
0	black	0.00	0.0	0.0	8	brown	0.25	0.5	-0.5
1	magenta	0.25	0.5	0.5	9	orange	0.50	1.0	0.0
2	dark blue	0.25	-0.5	0.5	10	gray 2	0.50	0.0	0.0
3	purple	0.50	0.0	1.0	11	pink	0.75	0.5	0.5
4	dark green	0.25	-0.5	-0.5	12	light green	0.50	0.0	-1.0
5	gray 1	0.50	0.0	0.0	13	yellow	0.75	0.5	-0.5
6	medium blue	0.50	-1.0	0.0	14	aquamarine	0.75	-0.5	-0.5
7	light blue	0.75	-0.5	0.5	15	white	1.0	0.0	0.0

High-res mode palette

The majority of Apple graphic applications used the hi-res mode, which had 280×192 pixels (effectively 140x192 on a color monitor). The hi-res mode had six colors: black, white, blue, orange, green and purple.

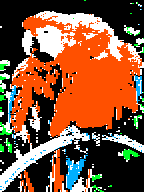

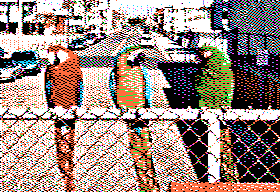

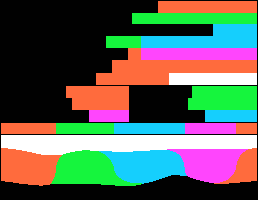

Apple II Hi-Res colors and YIQ values
High bit	Pixel pair	Number	Name	YIQ		
High bit	Pixel pair	Number	Name	Y	I	Q
0	00	0	black	0.0	0.0	0.0
0	01	1	green	0.5	0	-1
0	10	2	purple	0.5	0	1
0	11	3	white	1.0	0.0	0.0
1	00	4	black	0.0	0.0	0.0
1	01	5	orange	0.5	1	0
1	10	6	blue	0.5	−1	0
1	11	7	white	1.0	0.0	0.0

=== Systems based on MOS Technology chips ===
For all the following computers from Commodore, the U and V coordinates for the composite video colors are always the cosine and the sine, respectively, of angles multiple of 22.5 degrees (i.e. a quarter of 90°), as the engineers were inspired by the NTSC color wheel, a radial way to figure out the U and V coordinates of points equidistant from the center of the chroma plane, the gray. Consumers in Europe (which uses PAL) considered the Commodore colors to be more "washed out" and less vivid than those provided by computers such as the ZX Spectrum.

==== VIC-20 ====
The VIC-20 uses a MOS Technology VIC chip which produces a 16-color YPbPr composite video palette. The palette lacks any intermediate shade of gray, and it has 5 or 9 levels of luminance.

The VIC-20 lacks any true graphic mode, but a 22×11 text mode with 200 definable characters of 8×16 bits each arranged as a matrix of 20×10 characters is usually used instead, giving a 3:2(NTSC)/5:3(PAL) pixel aspect ratio, 160×160 pixels, 8-color "high-res mode" or a 3:1(NTSC)/10:3(PAL) pixel aspect ratio, 80×160 pixels, 10-color "multicolor mode".

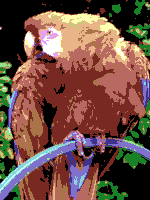
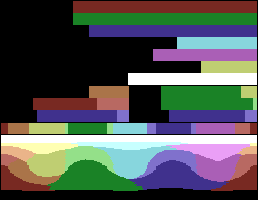
VIC-20 palette

In the 8-color high-res mode, every 8×8 pixels can have the background color (shared for the entire screen) or a free foreground color, both selectable among the first eight colors of the palette. In the 10-color multicolor mode, a single pixel of every 4×8 block (a character cell) may have any of four colors: the background color, the auxiliary color (both shared for the entire screen and selectable among the entire palette), the same color as the overscan border (also a shared color) or a free foreground color, both selectable among the first eight colors of the palette.

Simulated images

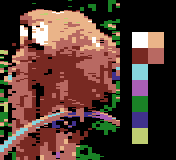
Multicolor mode

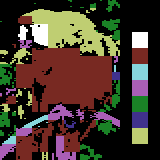
High-res mode

On some models of the system, there are nine levels of luminance:

Number — name	Y	Pb (rel.)	Pr (rel.)	Number — name	Y	Pb (rel.)	Pr (rel.)
0 — black	0	0	0	8 — orange	0.375	−0.7071068	0.7071068
1 — white	1	0	0	9 — light orange	0.625	−0.7071068	0.7071068
2 — red	0.3125	−0.3826834	0.9238795	10 — light red	0.5	−0.3826834	0.9238795
3 — cyan	0.6875	0.3826834	−0.9238795	11 — light cyan	0.75	0.3826834	−0.9238795
4 — purple	0.3125	0.7071068	0.7071068	12 — light purple	0.5	0.7071068	0.7071068
5 — green	0.5	−0.7071068	−0.7071068	13 — light green	0.75	−0.7071068	−0.7071068
6 — blue	0.25	1	0	14 — light blue	0.5	1	0
7 — yellow	0.75	−1	0	15 — light yellow	1	−1	0

But on other models, there are only five levels of luminance:

Number — name	Y	Pb (rel.)	Pr (rel.)	Number — name	Y	Pb (rel.)	Pr (rel.)
0 — black	0	0	0	8 — orange	0.5	−0.7071068	0.7071068
1 — white	1	0	0	9 — light orange	0.75	−0.7071068	0.7071068
2 — red	0.25	−0.3826834	0.9238795	10 — light red	0.5	−0.3826834	0.9238795
3 — cyan	0.75	0.3826834	−0.9238795	11 — light cyan	1	0.3826834	−0.9238795
4 — purple	0.5	0.7071068	0.7071068	12 — light purple	0.75	0.7071068	0.7071068
5 — green	0.5	−0.7071068	−0.7071068	13 — light green	0.75	−0.7071068	−0.7071068
6 — blue	0.25	1	0	14 — light blue	0.5	1	0
7 — yellow	0.75	−1	0	15 — light yellow	1	−1	0

==== Commodore 64 ====
The MOS Technology VIC-II is used in the Commodore 64 (and Commodore 128 in 40-column mode), and features a 16-color YPbPr composite video palette. This palette is largely based on that of the VIC, but it substitutes three colors by three levels of gray. When displayed over an analog NTSC composite video output, the actual resulting colors are more vivid.

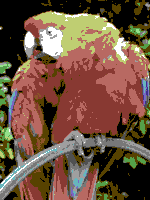
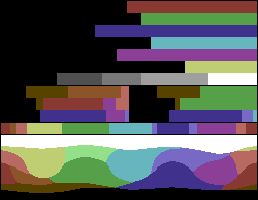
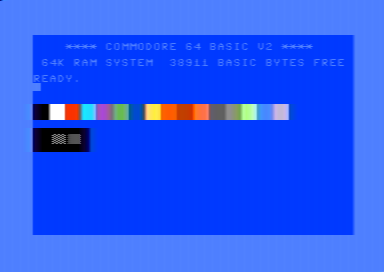
Sample image	Color test chart	C64 palette on NTSC (Sony CXA2025 decoder matrix)
Color palette

The Commodore 64 has two graphic modes: Multicolor and High Resolution.

In the Multicolor 160×200, 16-color mode, every cell of 4×8, 2:1 aspect ratio pixels can have one of four colors: one shared with the entire screen, the two background and foreground colors of the corresponding text mode character, and one more color also stored in the color RAM area, all of them freely selectable among the entire palette.

In the High-Resolution 320×200, 16-color mode, every cell of 8×8 pixels can have one of the two background and foreground colors of the correspondent text mode character, both freely selectable among the entire palette.

Simulated images

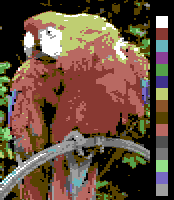
16-color multicolor mode

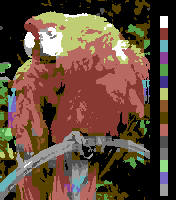
16-color High-res mode

On most models of the Commodore 64, there are nine levels of luminance:

Number — name	Y	Pb (rel.)	Pr (rel.)	Number — name	Y	Pb (rel.)	Pr (rel.)
0 — black	0	0	0	8 — orange	0.375	−0.7071068	0.7071068
1 — white	1	0	0	9 — brown	0.25	−0.9238795	0.3826834
2 — red	0.3125	−0.3826834	0.9238795	10 — light red	0.5	−0.3826834	0.9238795
3 — cyan	0.625	0.3826834	−0.9238795	11 — dark grey	0.3125	0	0
4 — purple	0.375	0.7071068	0.7071068	12 — grey	0.46875	0	0
5 — green	0.5	−0.7071068	−0.7071068	13 — light green	0.75	−0.7071068	−0.7071068
6 — blue	0.25	1	0	14 — light blue	0.46875	1	0
7 — yellow	0.75	−1	0	15 — light grey	0.625	0	0

==== Commodore 16 and Plus/4 ====
The MOS Technology TED was used in the Commodore 16 and Plus/4. It has a palette of 121 YPbPr composite video colors consisting of sixteen hues (including black and white) at eight luminance levels. Black is the same color at every luminance level, so there are not 128 different colors. On the Commodore Plus/4, twelve colors formed a "default" palette of sorts accessible through keyboard shortcuts; these colors are underlined in the table below (RGB converted colors at a saturation level of 34%).

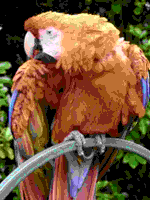

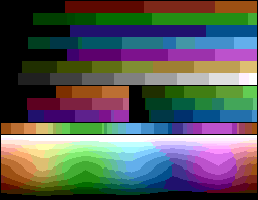

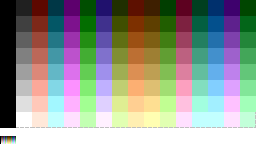

The Commodore 16 and Commodore Plus/4 have two graphic modes very similar to those of the Commodore 64: Multicolor and High Resolution.

In the Multicolor 160×200, 121-color mode, every cell of 4×8, 2:1 aspect ratio pixels can have one of four colors: two shared with the entire screen and the two background and foreground colors of the correspondent text mode character, all of them freely selectable among the entire 121-color palette (hue 0 to 15 and luminance 0 to 7 are set individually for any of them).

In the High-Resolution 320×200, 121-color mode, every cell of 8×8 pixels can have one of the two background and foreground colors of the corresponding text mode character, both freely selectable among the entire 121-color palette (again setting both the hue and the luminance).

Simulated images

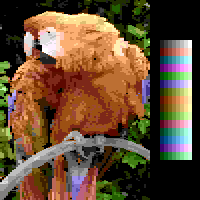
121-color Multicolor mode

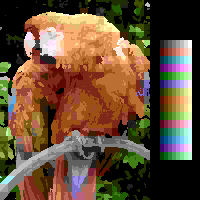
121-color High-res mode

MOS Technology TED YPbPr composite palette
hue #	Pb (rel.)	Pr (rel.)	Y							
hue #	Pb (rel.)	Pr (rel.)	0.125	0.25	0.375	0.5	0.625	0.75	0.875	1
0 — black	0	0	0,0	0,1	0,2	0,3	0,4	0,5	0,6	0,7
1 — white	0	0	1,0	1,1	1,2	1,3	1,4	1,5	1,6	1,7
2 — red	−0.3826834	0.9238795	2,0	2,1	2,2	2,3	2,4	2,5	2,6*	2,7*
3 — cyan	0.3826834	−0.9238795	3,0*	3,1	3,2	3,3	3,4	3,5	3,6	3,7*
4 — purple	0.7071068	0.7071068	4,0*	4,1	4,2	4,3	4,4	4,5	4,6*	4,7*
5 — green	−0.7071068	−0.7071068	5,0*	5,1	5,2	5,3	5,4	5,5	5,6*	5,7*
6 — blue	1	0	6,0	6,1	6,2	6,3	6,4	6,5*	6,6*	6,7*
7 — yellow	−1	0	7,0*	7,1*	7,2	7,3	7,4	7,5	7,6	7,7*
8 — orange	−0.7071068	0.7071068	8,0*	8,1	8,2	8,3	8,4	8,5	8,6*	8,7*
9 — brown	−0.9238795	0.3826834	9,0*	9,1*	9,2	9,3	9,4	9,5	9,6	9,7*
10 — yellow-green	−0.9238795	−0.3826834	10,0*	10,1*	10,2	10,3	10,4	10,5	10,6	10,7*
11 — pink	0	1	11,0	11,1	11,2	11,3	11,4	11,5	11,6*	11,7*
12 — blue-green	0	−1	12,0*	12,1	12,2	12,3	12,4	12,5	12,6	12,7*
13 — light blue	0.7071068	−0.7071068	13,0*	13,1	13,2	13,3	13,4	13,5	13,6*	13,7*
14 — dark blue	0.9238795	0.3826834	14,0	14,1	14,2	14,3	14,4	14,5*	14,6*	14,7*
15 — light green	−0.3826834	−0.9238795	15,0*	15,1	15,2	15,3	15,4	15,5	15,6*	15,7*

Note: colors marked with an asterisk (*) are out of the RGB gamut.

=== Systems based on the Texas Instruments TMS9918 chip ===
The TMS9918 is a Video Display Controller (VDC) manufactured by Texas Instruments and introduced in 1979. The TMS9918 and its variants were used in the Memotech MTX, MSX, Sord M5, Tatung Einstein and Tomy Tutor.

The TMS9918 chip which uses a proprietary 15-color YPbPr composite video palette encoded palette plus a transparent color, intended to be used by the hardware sprites and simple video overlay. When used as an ordinary background color, it is rendered using the same color as the screen border.

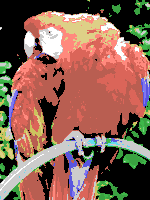

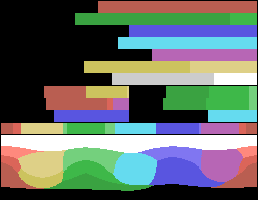

TMS9918 YPbPr composite video palette
Number — name	Y	Pb	Pr
0 — transparent	0%	0%	0%
1 — black	0%	47%	47%
2 — medium green	53%	20%	7%
3 — light green	67%	27%	17%
4 — dark blue	40%	100%	40%
5 — light blue	53%	93%	43%
6 — dark red	47%	30%	83%
7 — cyan	73%	70%	0%
8 — medium red	53%	27%	93%
9 — (light red)	67%	27%	93%
10 — dark yellow	73%	7%	57%
11 — light yellow	80%	17%	57%
12 — dark green	47%	23%	13%
13 — magenta	53%	67%	73%
14 — gray	80%	47%	47%
15 — white	100%	47%	47%

Note: CColors are merely illustrative, using automated YPbPr to sRGB conversion assuming SMPTE C colorimetry .

==== MSX ====
The MSX series has two graphic modes. The MSX BASIC Screen 3 mode is a low-resolution mode with 15 colors, in which every pixel can be any of the 15 available colors. Screen mode 2 is a 256×192 high-resolution mode with 15 colors, in which each of every eight consecutive pixels can only use 2 colors.

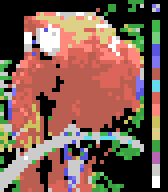
15-color screen mode 3

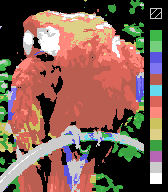
15-color screen mode 2

=== Systems based on the Motorola 6847 chip ===
The Motorola 6847 is a video display generator (VDG) first introduced by Motorola and used in the TRS-80 Color Computer, Dragon 32/64, Laser 200, TRS-80 MC-10, NEC PC-6000 series, Acorn Atom, and the APF Imagination Machine, among others.

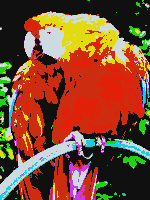

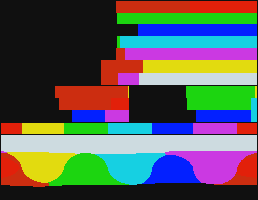

Color is generated by the combination of three signals, $Y$ (luminance) with 6 possible levels, $\phi A$ and $\phi B$ (chroma) with 3 possible levels, based on the YPbPr colorspace, and then converted for output into a NTSC analog signal.

The following table shows the signal values used:

Color	$Y$	$\phi A$	$\phi B$
Green	0.54	1.0	1.0
Yellow	0.42	1.0	1.5
Blue	0.72	2.0	1.5
Red	0.72	1.5	2.0
Buff	0.42	1.5	1.5
Cyan	0.54	1.5	1.5
Magenta	0.54	2.0	2.0
Orange	0.54	1.0	2.0
Black	0.72	1.5	1.5
Dark Green	0.72	1.0	1.0
Dark Orange	0.72	1.0	2.0

==== TRS-80 Color Computer ====
The TRS-80 Color Computer is capable of displaying text and graphics contained within a roughly square display matrix 256 pixels wide by 192 lines high. The hardware palette has 9 colors: black, green, yellow, blue, red, buff (dark white), cyan, magenta, and orange.

All colors are available in text modes. In color modes (64×64, 128×64, 128×96, and 128×192) two four color palettes are available: a green border with the colors green, yellow, red, and blue; a white border with the colors white, cyan, magenta, and orange.

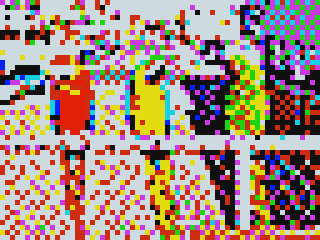
Text Mode (9 colors)

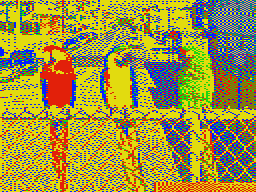
Color mode (4 colors)

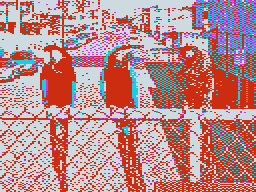
Color mode (alternate palette)

==== NEC PC-6000 series ====
Similar to other computers using the same video chip, the NEC PC-6000 series had four screen modes:

- 32x16 characters with 4 colors
- 64x48 pixel graphics with 9 colors
- 128x192 graphics with 4 colors
- 256x192 graphics with 2 colors (green, white)

=== Tandy Color Computer 3 ===
ExThe Tandy Color Computer 3 could display all of the modes of the Tandy Color Computer 1 and 2 / TRS-80 Color Computer, except the Semigraphics modes. Taking the place of the graphics and memory hardware of the previous machines is an application-specific integrated circuit called (officially) the Advanced Color Video Chip (ACVC) or (unofficially) the Graphics Interrupt Memory Enhancer (GIME).

With colors from a palette of 64, this chip is capable of displaying four combinations of colors and resolutions: 320x192x4, 320x192x16, 640x192x2, and 640x192x4. There are two palette modes: RGB and Composite. Both modes use a six-bit arrangement.

In Composite mode there are four levels of Intensity (luminance) and sixteen distinct Phase (chroma) values.

Tandy Color Computer 3 composite color palette value bits
Bit 5	Bit 4	Bit 3	Bit 2	Bit 1	Bit 0
Intensity 1	Intensity 0	Phase 3	Phase 2	Phase 1	Phase 0

The following colors are listed on the service manual as examples of this arrangement: White – 110000; Black – 000000; Bright Green – 100010; Medium Green – 010010; Dark Green – 000010 and Medium Magenta – 010101.

Tandy Color Computer 3 composite palette examples
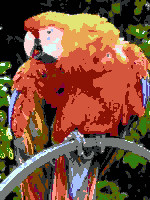

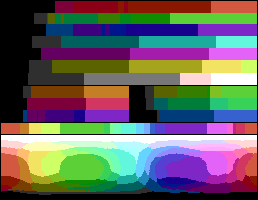

== Other palettes ==
=== SAM Coupé ===
The 128 colour master palette used by the SAM Coupé is produced via a unique method – it effectively contains 2 groups of 64 "RGB" colours of mildly different intensity, and ultimately derived from a 512 colour space. The closest equivalent in more popular and well-known machines would be the Commodore Amiga's 64-colour "Extra Half-Brite" mode (with 32 explicitly set colours using 5 bitplanes, which are displayed with full or half brightness depending on the bit setting of a 6th plane).

Two bits are used for each of Red, Green and Blue and give a similar result to a normal 6-bit RGB palette (as seen with the IBM EGA or Sega Master System); the seventh bit encodes "brightness" which has an effect similar to – but more subtle than – the Spectrum, increasing the output of all three channels by half the intensity of the lower bits of the main six (in this way, it does make a genuine 128 colours – rather than 127 colours with "two blacks" and only a 7-level grayscale).

The layout of the byte that encodes each colour is complicated and appears like a Spectrum colour nybble transferred to a full byte's width, and an extra RGB bit-triplet then prefixed to it, with the MSB left unused.

SAM Coupé colour palette value bits
Bit 7	Bit 6	Bit 5	Bit 4	Bit 3	Bit 2	Bit 1	Bit 0
-	Green 1	Red 1	Blue 1	Half-Bright	Green 0	Red 0	Blue 0

Resulting colour palette:

SAM Coupé colour palette example images
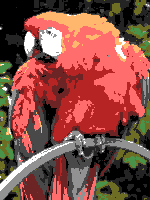

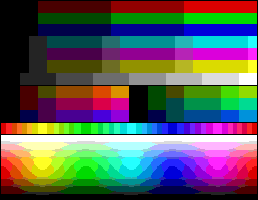

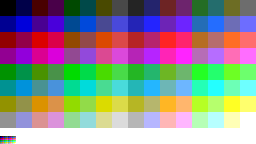

SAM Coupé color palette and bitmask
0x00	0x01	0x02	0x03	0x04	0x05	0x06	0x07	0x08	0x09	0x0A	0x0B	0x0C	0x0D	0x0E	0x0F
0x10	0x11	0x12	0x13	0x14	0x15	0x16	0x17	0x18	0x19	0x1A	0x1B	0x1C	0x1D	0x1E	0x1F
0x20	0x21	0x22	0x23	0x24	0x25	0x26	0x27	0x28	0x29	0x2A	0x2B	0x2C	0x2D	0x2E	0x2F
0x30	0x31	0x32	0x33	0x34	0x35	0x36	0x37	0x38	0x39	0x3A	0x3B	0x3C	0x3D	0x3E	0x3F
0x40	0x41	0x42	0x43	0x44	0x45	0x46	0x47	0x48	0x49	0x4A	0x4B	0x4C	0x4D	0x4E	0x4F
0x50	0x51	0x52	0x53	0x54	0x55	0x56	0x57	0x58	0x59	0x5A	0x5B	0x5C	0x5D	0x5E	0x5F
0x60	0x61	0x62	0x63	0x64	0x65	0x66	0x67	0x68	0x69	0x6A	0x6B	0x6C	0x6D	0x6E	0x6F
0x70	0x71	0x72	0x73	0x74	0x75	0x76	0x77	0x78	0x79	0x7A	0x7B	0x7C	0x7D	0x7E	0x7F

These colours can be used on the four available display modes:

- Mode 4 – 256×192 graphics with 16 colours
- Mode 3 – 512×192 graphics with 4 colours
- Mode 2 – 256×192 graphics with 2 colours (from 16) for each 8-wide block of pixels
- Mode 1 – 256×192 graphics with 2 colours (from 16) for each 8×8 block of pixels (matching the display of the ZX Spectrum for backwards compatibility)

SAM Coupé video modes example images
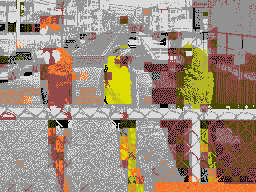
SAM Coupé mode 1 example image

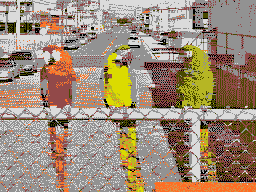
SAM Coupé mode 2 example image

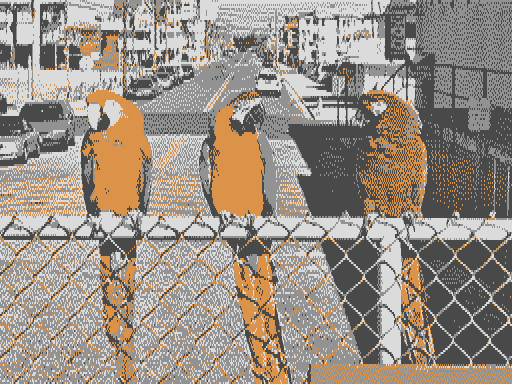
SAM Coupé mode 3 example image

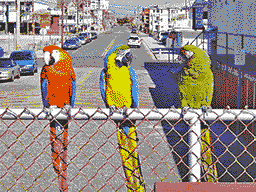
SAM Coupé mode 4 example image

== Side-by-side comparison ==
Since there are many 8-bit computers to compare, a comparison table has been compiled to make comparing the systems easier.

8-bit computer color palettes
Computer(s)	Picture sample(s)	Entire palette(s)	Number of colors on screen	Resolution(s)
Apple II	Hi-res: Lo-res:	Hi-res: Lo-res:	6 (high-resolution mode), or 16 (low-resolution mode)	280×192 in high resolution or 40×48 in low resolution
Atari 8-bit computers	Mode 15 (with color interrupts and MCS):		9 colors per scanline on mode 15 via masking the 4 sprites for colors, and interrupts.	Ranges from 320×192, with 1 color, to 80×192 with 9 colors.
Mattel Aquarius			16 colors	40×24 characters
BBC Micro			Ranges from 2 to 8 colors	Ranges from 640×256 to 160×256
Commodore 64	High-res mode: Multicolor mode:		All 16 colors can be present in one screen. However, 4 can be present in one 4×8 cell in multicolor mode, and three of those colors must be shared. 2 colors can be present in every 8×8 cell in high-resolution mode.	320 × 200 in high-resolution mode 160 × 200 in multicolor mode
CGA	16 color mode: 4 color modes: 2 color mode:		320×200 graphics mode is restricted to fixed palettes containing only four colors; 640×200 graphic mode is only two colors	160 x 200, 320 x 200, 640 x 200

== See also ==
- List of color palettes
- List of monochrome and RGB color formats
- List of software palettes
- List of video game console palettes
- List of 16-bit computer color palettes
- Palette (computing)
- Indexed color
- Color Lookup Table
- Color depth
