= YJK =

Color space implemented by the Yamaha V9958 graphic chip

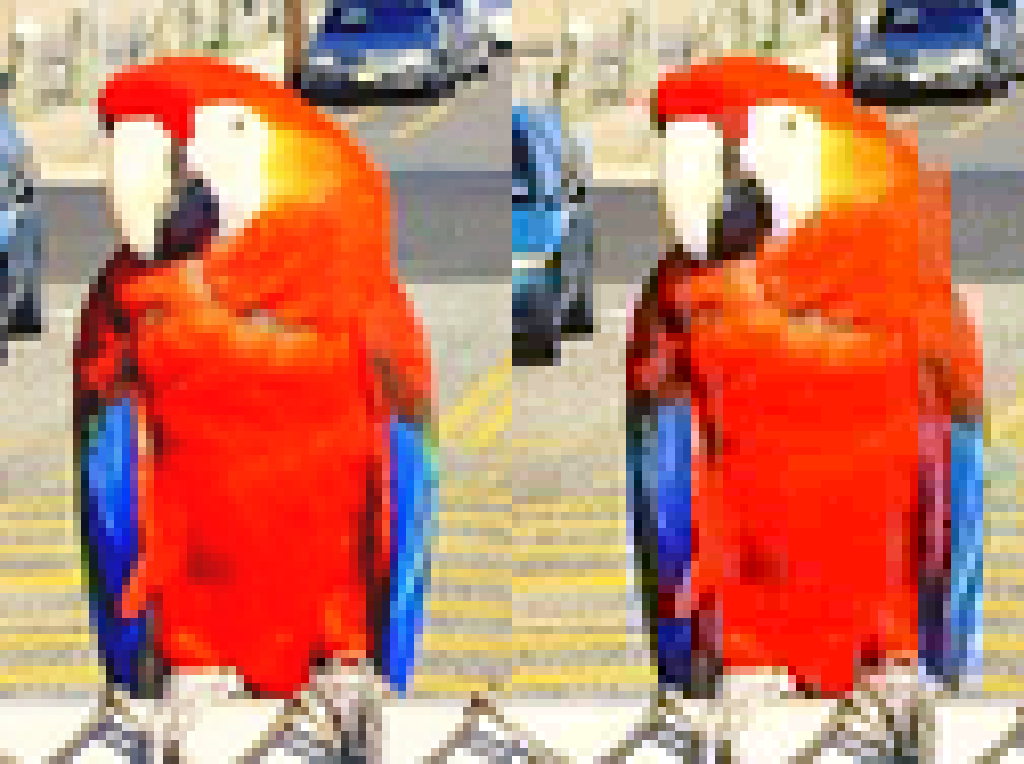
Cropped and zoomed comparison between the original true color image (left) and the YJK (right) version.

YJK is a proprietary color space implemented by the Yamaha V9958 graphic chip on MSX2+ computers. It has the advantage of encoding images by implementing less resolution for color information than for brightness, taking advantage of the human visual systems' lower acuity for color differences. This saves memory, transmission and computing power.

YJK is composed of three components: $Y$, $J$ and $K$. $Y$ is similar to luminance (but computed differently), $J$ and $K$ are the chrominance components (representing red and green color differences).

The $Y$ component is a 5-bit unsigned value (0 to 31), specified for each individual pixel. The $J$ and $K$ components are stored together in 6 bits as a complement signed value (-32 to 31) and shared between 4 adjacent horizontal pixels (4:1:1 chroma sub-sampling).

The following table shows the encoding of this information across 4 pixels:

YJK bit encoding
Pixel coordinates	Bits							
Pixel coordinates	7	6	5	4	3	2	1	0
0,0	Y1					K low		
0,1	Y2					K high		
0,2	Y3					J low		
0,3	Y4					J high		

This arrangement allows for the encoding of 19,268 different colors. While conceptually similar to YUV, chroma sampling, numerical relationship between the components, and transformation to and from RGB are different in YJK.

== Formulas ==
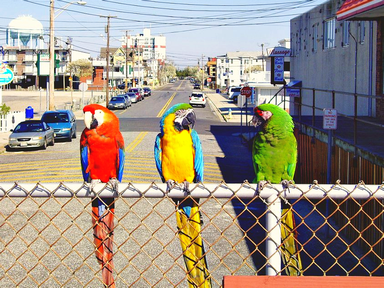
Original full color image

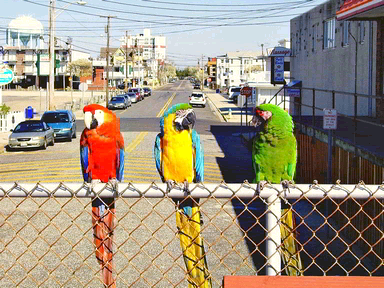
YJK converted image

The three component signals are created from an original RGB (red, green and blue) source. The weighted values of $R$, $G$ and $B$ are added together to produce a single $Y$ signal, representing the overall brightness of that pixel. The $J$ signal is then created by subtracting the $Y$ from the red signal of the original RGB, and then scaling; and $K$ by subtracting the $Y$ from the green, and then scaling by a different factor.

These formulae approximate the conversion between the RGB color space and YJK:

From RGB to YJK:

$$Y = B/2 + R/4 + G/8$$
$$J = R-Y$$
$$K=G-Y$$

From YJK to RGB:

$$R =  Y + J$$
$$G =  Y + K$$
$$B= (5/4)Y -J/2 -K/4$$

The $Y$ component of YJK is not true luminance, since the green component has less weight than the blue component. Also, contrary to YUV where chrominance is based on Red-Blue differences, on YJK its calculated based on Red-Green differences.

== See also ==
- YUV
- MSX2+
- Hold-And-Modify
