= Yamaha V9958 =

Video display processor

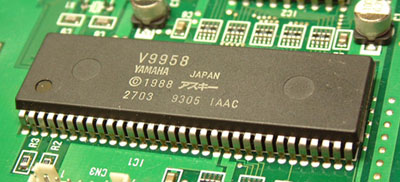
Yamaha V9958

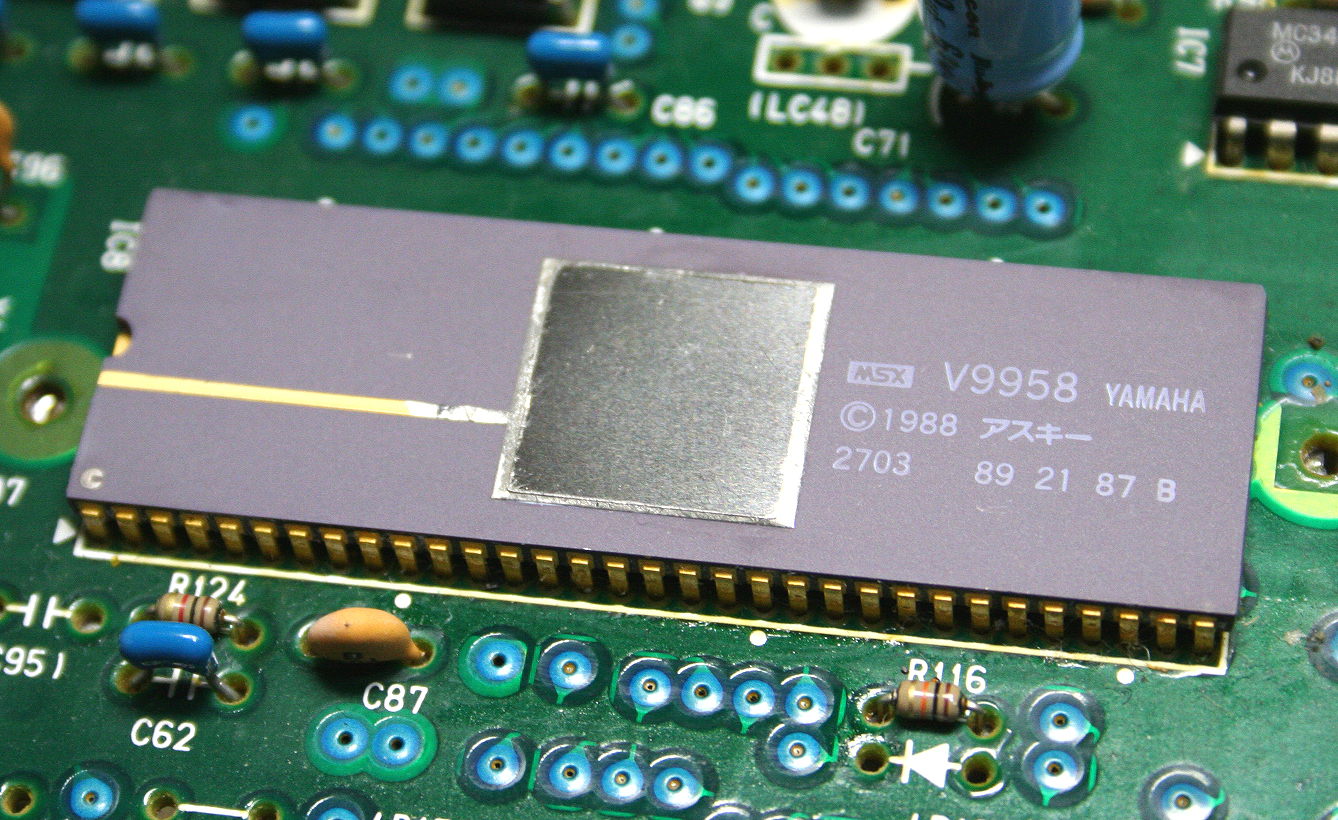
Yamaha V9958 in ceramic package

The Yamaha V9958 is a Video Display Processor used in the MSX2+ and MSX turbo R series of home computers, as the successor to the Yamaha V9938 used in the MSX2, as well as the "TI Image Maker" video expansion for the TI-99/4A home computer. The main new features are three graphical YJK modes with up to 19268 colors and horizontal scrolling registers. The V9958 was not as widely adopted as the V9938.

== Specifications ==
- Video RAM: 128 KB + 64 KB of expanded VRAM
- Text modes: 80 × 24 and 32 × 24
- Resolution: 512 × 212 (4 or 16 colors out of 512) and 256 × 212 (16, 256, 12499 or 19268 colors)
- Sprites: 32, 16 colors, max 8 per horizontal line
- Hardware acceleration for copy, line, fill, etc.
- Interlacing to double vertical resolution
- Horizontal and vertical scroll registers

=== Feature changes from the V9938 ===
The following features were added to or removed from the Yamaha V9938 specifications:

- Added horizontal scrolling registers
- Added YJK graphics modes (similar to YUV):
  - G7 + YJK + YAE: 256 x 212, 12499 colors + 16 color palette
  - G7 + YJK: 256 × 212, 19268 colors
- Added the ability to execute hardware accelerated commands in non-bitmap screen modes
- Removed lightpen and mouse functions
- Removed composite video output function

== MSX-specific terminology ==
On MSX, the screen modes are often referred to by their assigned number in MSX BASIC. This mapping is as follows:

| Basic mode | VDP mode | MSX system |
|---|---|---|
| Screen 0 (width 40) | T1 | MSX 1 |
| Screen 0 (width 80) | T2 | MSX 2 |
| Screen 1 | G1 | MSX 1 |
| Screen 2 | G2 | MSX 1 |
| Screen 3 | MC | MSX 1 |
| Screen 4 | G3 | MSX 2 |
| Screen 5 | G4 | MSX 2 |
| Screen 6 | G5 | MSX 2 |
| Screen 7 | G6 | MSX 2 |
| Screen 8 | G7 | MSX 2 |
| Screen 10 | G7 with YJK and YAE | MSX 2+ and tR |
| Screen 11 | G7 with YJK and YAE | MSX 2+ and tR |
| Screen 12 | G7 with YJK | MSX 2+ and tR |

Note: Screen 9 was reserved for South Korean MSX2 units.
