= Dragonlord =

Dragonlord or Dragon Lord may refer to:

- Dragon Lord, a 1982 Hong Kong kung fu film starring Jackie Chan
- Dragonlord (band), the American symphonic black metal band
- Dragonlord (board game), a 1976 board game of aerial dragon combat
- Dragon Lord (character), a fictional character in the Marvel Universe
- Dragon Lord (video game), the 1990 video game released for Amiga, Atari ST, and MS-DOS
- The Dragon Lord (Drake novel), a 1979 novel by David Drake
- The Dragon Lord (Morwood novel), a 1986 novel by Peter Morwood
- The Dragon Lord (Chivalry & Sorcery), a 1984 fantasy role-playing game adventure
- DragonLords, a British role-playing game magazine
- "Dragonlords" (Joanne Bertin), a race of beings that change from human to dragon at will in Joanne Bertin's novels
- Dragon Lord, the main villain from the TV show Ninja Turtles: The Next Mutation
- Dragonlord, the main villain of the first Dragon Quest video game

== See also ==
- Dragon King
