= David Joiner =

American game programmer (born 1958)

David "Talin" Joiner
- Born: June 1958 (age 68)
- Occupations: Video game programmer, designer
- Employer(s): MicroIllusions; The Dreamers Guild; Electronic Arts; Google
- Known for: The Faery Tale Adventure; Inherit the Earth

David "Talin" Joiner (born June 1958) is an American game programmer, who created games such as The Faery Tale Adventure and Inherit the Earth, contributed audio to Defender of the Crown II (1993), engineering for SimCity 4: Rush Hour (2003), and The Sims 2: University (2005).

== Career as programmer ==
Joiner learned assembler, Fortran, and COBOL programming between 1976 and 1980 at the Strategic Air Command headquarters in Omaha, Nebraska. In his spare time, he coded a space war game on terminals. At the location, he also became familiar with coding on the PET and Apple II. After leaving the military, he joined Datasoft as a programmer programmer. He then became part of IntelliCreations, and then Mindscape, then began working on the Amiga 1000 and with MicroIllusions, which started out from a computer store in San Fernando Valley.

According to The Digital Antiquarian, "The seeds of MicroIllusions were planted during one day’s idle conversation when Steinert complained to David Joiner that, while the Amiga supposedly had speech synthesis built into its operating system, he had never actually heard his machines talk.... He proved as good as his word within a few hours. Impressed, Steinert asked if he could sell the new program in his store for a straight 50/50 split. When the program sold well, Steinert decided to get into Amiga software development in earnest with the help of Joiner."

Joiner then began working on The Faery Tale Adventure, which took him seven months. MicroIllusions published it in 1986. In 1988, he wrote Discovery, an educational music editor related to the game. Joiner appeared on television of the Computer Chronicles to demonstrate Music-X. He later published under Sylvan Technical Arts. He worked a year on The Sims 2, then left EA. More recently, he worked on the user interface of Google+.

== Publications ==
In 1998 Joiner published Real interactivity in interactive entertainment.
