= MicroIllusions =

Former computer development company

MicroIllusions was a computer game developer and publisher of the home computer era (late 1980s to early 1990s). Based in Granada Hills, California, the company was a strong supporter of the Amiga and typically released titles on that platform before porting it to others.

Activision cancelled it as an affiliated publisher after a year of signing it up. The company went out of business in or about 1990.

== General ==
The company impact has been summed up as, "During MicroIllusion’s brief existence it produced some visionary software that, like so much else that came out of the Amiga scene, gave the world an imperfect glimpse of its multimedia future. That’s as true of Photon Paint, the progenitor of photographic-quality visual editors like Adobe Photoshop, as it is of Music-X, a forerunner of easy-to-use music packages like GarageBand."

== Founding ==
According to The Digital Antiquarian, "The seeds of MicroIllusions were planted during one day’s idle conversation when Steinert complained to David Joiner that, while the Amiga supposedly had speech synthesis built into its operating system, he had never actually heard his machines talk; .. He proved as good as his word within a few hours. Impressed, Steinert asked if he could sell the new program ' talk to me' in his store for a straight 50/50 split. Given his circumstances, Joiner was hardly in a position to quibble. When the program sold well, Steinert decided to get into Amiga software development in earnest with the help of his wunderkind."

== Applications ==
- Photon Paint 1.0 (2D painting with 3D generation) (1987) Amiga
- Photon Video: Cel Animator (animation) (1988) Amiga
- Transport Controller (animation) (1988) Amiga
- Photon Paint 2.0 (2D painting with 3D generation) (1989) Amiga / Mac
- Edit Decision List Processor (film/video production) (1989) Amiga
- Genesis: The Third Day (3D landscape generation) (1991) Amiga
- Music-X (1989) David Joiner (Talin)
- Music-X Jr
- Dynamic CAD 2.3
- Dynamic Word
- The Planetarium
- Micro Midi
- Dynamic Publisher

== Games ==
- Discovery (1986), Amiga, MS-DOS, C64, Mega Drive. Created by David Joiner (Talin). Addons were released: language, Math, Science, Social Studies, Spell, Trivia 1
- Discovery 2.0 (1990)
- Blackjack Academy (1987), Amiga, MS-DOS, Apple IIGS created by Westwood
- Ebonstar (1988), Amiga, created by the Dreamers Guild
- Romantic Encounters at the Dome (1988) Amiga, MS-DOS, Mac
- Faery Tale Adventure (1987) Amiga, C64, MS-DOS, Mega Drive
- Galactic Invasion (1987) Amiga. Developed by Silent Software.
- Tracers (1988) Developed by Hacker Corp. Amiga
- Fire Power (1988) Amiga, C64, Apple IIGS, MS-DOS
- Mainframe (1988) C64
- Craps Academy (1988) Europe-only release, Amiga Developed by Silent Software.
- Questmaster 1: Prism of Heheutotol (a.k.a. Dondra: A New Beginning) (1988) C64, MS-DOS (Apple II version by Spectrum Holobyte)
- Turbo (1989) Developed by Silent Software. Amiga
- Laser Squad (published, 1989) Developed by Blade (Teque) Amiga, Amstrad CPC, Atari ST, C64, MS-DOS, ZX Spectrum, MSX, PC-98
- Dr. Plummet's House of Flux (1989)
- Jetsons George Jetson and the Legend of Robotopia (1989), Amiga, Mac. Developed by The Dreamers Guild
- Land Of Legends, Unreleased, Developed by Parsec Soft Systems.
- Faery Tale Adventure II: Halls of the Dead (1997), sometimes credited to MicroIllusions, was completed by The Dreamers Guild for various platforms.
