= Ebonstar =

1988 video game

- Developer: The Dreamers Guild
- Publisher: MicroIllusions
- Platform: Amiga
- Release: EU: 1988
- Genre: Multidirectional shooter
- Modes: Single-player, multiplayer

Ebonstar is a multidirectional shooter for the Amiga developed by The Dreamers Guild and published in 1988 by MicroIllusions.

== Gameplay ==
The player controls a fleet of 31st century spacecraft which can use their weaponry to knock the ships of their opponents into a moving black hole, while more opponents to continue to come out of the black hole. As many as four players can compete simultaneously.

== Reception ==
In 1988, Dragon gave the game 5 out of 5 stars.
