= Digital Creations =

Digital Creations may refer to:

- A company based in Folsom, California that developed software for the Amiga, including Brilliance
- A company based in Fredericksburg, Virginia that developed Zope
