= The Faery Tale Adventure =

1987 video game

- Cover art by Ed Kline
- Developer: MicroIllusions (Note: Ported to Commodore 64 and IBM PC by Sculptured Software and ported to Sega Genesis by New World Computing.)
- Publisher: MicroIllusions (Note: Sega Genesis version published by Electronic Arts.)
- Designer: David Joiner
- Platforms: Amiga, Commodore 64, MS-DOS, Genesis
- Release: 1987: Amiga; 1988: C64; 1989: MS-DOS; July 1991: Genesis
- Genre: Action role-playing
- Mode: Single-player

The Faery Tale Adventure is a 1987 action role-playing video game designed by David Joiner and published by MicroIllusions for the Amiga, and later ported to the Commodore 64, MS-DOS, and Sega Genesis. The MS-DOS version is titled The Faery Tale Adventure: Book I. Microillusions also released a "Book 1" version for the Amiga which was going to be the start of a series of games, according to Talin, but bankruptcy prevented it. The initial version was produced for the Amiga 1000 and featured the largest game world to that date. A sequel, Faery Tale Adventure II: Halls of the Dead, was released in 1997.

== Gameplay ==
Amiga screenshot

The gameplay resembles that of Ultima VII (1992). It had the largest game world at the time of release, with over 17,000 screens.

Each playable character has his strengths and weaknesses. Julian is a brave fighter, Phillip has luck and cleverness, and Kevin is gentle and kind. Each of these attributes affects vital game stats and the success of the quest:

- A high Bravery score contributes to Vitality ("Vit"), the character's health. It can be increased by slaying enemies.
- Luck determines the number of times that a brother can be brought back from death if he is killed during the quest. If Luck runs out, the next brother must take up the quest.
- Kindness is important for certain key chapters in the game. It can be increased by acts of kindness, such as giving alms to beggars.

The technique used to store such a huge world involved creating small-sized maps out of small blocks. Those small maps were reused and fit together seamlessly to form larger areas. Loading is asynchronous, and happens when nearing the boundary of an area, without affecting the scrolling, animation, and music.

== Plot ==
The game is based around the quest of three brothers to retrieve the talisman stolen by the forces of evil and return it to their home village, Tambry, in the country of Holm. The player begins as Julian, the eldest of the three brothers; if unsuccessful with this character, the player then takes control of Philip, the next oldest, then finally the youngest of the three, Kevin. In addition to recovering the talisman, which is kept by an evil necromancer, the player must complete a number of other tasks which ultimately prove vital to the quest - save the king's daughter, gain the aid of a sea turtle, and kill an evil witch in her castle - and gather a number of artefacts which enable access to the strange dimension in which the necromancer resides.

== Development ==
David Joiner designed The Faery Tale Adventure and was also responsible for the audio of Defender of the Crown II (1993), engineering for SimCity 4: Rush Hour (2003), and contributions to The Sims 2: Ultimate Collection.

This game was first released on the Amiga and then ported to other systems. Eventually it was released for the Commodore 64 and MS-DOS, although the graphics for these ports were of substantially lower quality due to hardware limitations. The Amiga version displays two screens as seen in the screenshot, one "lowres" 320 and one "hires" 640 pixels wide, allowing 64 + 16 colors.

In 1988, a port was developed for the Macintosh with 256 color graphics (more colors than the original Amiga version of the game). The only color Macintosh model at the time was the Macintosh II, which was prohibitively expensive for a successful gaming platform. The Macintosh port was never released, but a working beta was completed before the development was cancelled. Eventually New World Computing acquired MicroIllusions and in 1991 ported the game to the Sega Genesis which was published by Electronic Arts.

In November 2024, the game's developer released the source code to the original Amiga version on GitHub.

== Reception ==
Jerry Pournelle reported his son Phillip's experience with Faery Tale Adventure in BYTE: "eventually your character gets so powerful that no one can harm him, but he has to spend literally hours—in real time—going from one place to another. This gets dull fast". A review in Computer Gaming World described the game's user interface as natural and simple, while still being an impressive and playable game. The magazine stated that the Sega Genesis version "subtly improved on the original", such as a better teleportation system, while maintaining virtues such as excellent graphics. Dragon gave the computer game 4 1/2 out of 5 stars, and 4 out of 5 stars for the Genesis version. In 1996 Computer Gaming World ranked it as the 63rd best game of all time, calling it "Real time adventure at its Amiga best."

== Legacy ==
The sequel, Faery Tale Adventure II: Halls of the Dead, was developed by The Dreamers Guild and released by Encore, Inc. for MS-DOS and Windows in 1997. Its gameplay and graphics resemble Ultima VIII: Pagan.
