= The Endless Dungeon =

Tabletop role-playing game supplement

The Endless Dungeon is a supplement for fantasy role-playing games published by Wee Warriors in 1977.

== Contents ==
The Endless Dungeon consisted of six sheets of one-inch hex grid, and 15 sheets of cardstock, most of them printed with hallways and walls on one side. When players cut the hallways apart, they were to fold the walls upwards on either side of the hall, resulting in a three-dimensional U-shaped structure sized for 25 mm metal miniatures that was supposed to look like a hallway floor with walls on either side.

== Publication history ==
Wee Warriors was founded by Pete and Judith Kerestan in 1975 to take advantage of the popularity of TSR's new fantasy role-playing game Dungeons & Dragons by producing accessories for the game. The Endless Dungeon was one of their first products.

Game historian Shannon Appelcline noted in his 2014 book Designers & Dragons that initially Wee Warriors supplements were sold out of the trunk of Pete Kerestan's car, but in 1976 TSR picked them up for exclusive distribution: "Four of the first Wee Warriors products got more widely sold in this manner: The Character Archaic (1975), Palace of the Vampire Queen (1976), The Dwarven Glory (1977), and The Endless Dungeon (1977)."

== Reception ==
In the April–May 1978 edition of White Dwarf (Issue #6), Don Turnbull was not impressed with the production values of this accessory, stating "the Endless Dungeon pack gives the impression of having been thrown together."
