= Inherit the Earth =

1994 video game

Inherit the Earth: Quest for the Orb
- Developer: The Dreamers Guild
- Publishers: NA: New World Computing; EU: U.S. Gold; GER: Softgold; JP: StarCraft, Inc.; WW: The Wyrmkeep Entertainment (Windows, Mac, Linux
- Director: David Joiner
- Producer: Walter Hochbrueckner
- Designers: Carolly Hauksdottir; Robert McNally; David Joiner
- Writer: Robert Leh
- Composer: Matt Nathan
- Platforms: MS-DOS, Amiga, CD32, PC-98, Mac OS, OS X, Linux, Windows, Pocket PC, iOS
- Release: 1994
- Genre: Adventure
- Mode: Single-player

Inherit the Earth: Quest for the Orb is a point-and-click adventure game developed by The Dreamers Guild and published by New World Computing in 1994. The game is set in a world of talking humanoid animals, with the gameplay following on a fox on a quest to find a stolen orb, a relic of the mythical humans.

== Plot ==
In a far future, mankind is extinct and Earth is populated by several tribes of anthropomorphic animals – collectively referred to as the Morph – who have achieved a level of technology and societal sophistication roughly equivalent to Europe in the High Middle Ages. The humans are enshrined in legends as having been the ones who gave the Morph prehensile hands, mouths capable of speech, and the ability to think and feel, but the Morph have little understanding of their long-lost forebears, who exist now only in stories, ruins and a few technological relics.

The game begins with the protagonist, Rif of the Fox Tribe, being falsely accused of having stolen the Orb of Storms (a technological relic of humankind which is able to predict the weather), primarily based on the fact that he was one of only two foxes in the area at the time of the theft. Rif volunteers to look for the Orb himself, and is given assistance and guards in the form of Eeah of the Elk Guard and Okk of the Boar Tribe. The Boar King takes Rif's girlfriend Rhene hostage as insurance.

The trio travel throughout the Known Lands over the course of their investigation. Along the way, they encounter the various Tribes under the protection of the Forest King (the Elk Tribe ruler who exerts hegemonic control over the whole region), some of which have other Orbs containing other knowledge left behind by the humans. With the assistance of Sist, the leader of the Rats, they eventually discover that the Orb of Storms was stolen by a Raccoon, an animal rarely seen in the Known Lands. Sist also reveals that the Boar King has formed an alliance with the Wolves who live far to the north.

Riff, Okk, and Eeah attempt to pass into the Wild Lands, the untamed regions to the north, but are apprehended by Prince, the ruler of the castle in which the Dogs have sequestered themselves. Rif escapes, and eventually secures the help of Alama, a Cat hermit, and a tribe of wildcats to free his friends.

The trio then travel further north, to the isolated island claimed by the Wolves, where they learn that the Raccoon, Chota, has manipulated the Wolves' politics and stolen the Orb to take over the Known Lands, as the Orb of Storms is the key to a system left behind by the humans to control the weather. In Chota's fortress, a human hydroelectric dam, Rif, Okk and Eeah outwit their enemies, and Chota and the Orb are presumed lost. They return to the Known Lands, where Rif convinces the Tribes to work together, so that they will no longer need the Orbs to make their lives better. The Forest King takes his advice, promotes Okk and Eeah, and releases Rhene.

However, the Orb of Storms was not destroyed, and is preparing to initiate Chota's final command to begin a long drought, awaiting input on the ending date of the drought.

== Development ==
Inherit the Earth was developed by The Dreamers Guild for MS-DOS and published by New World Computing.

David Joiner, one of the game's developers, said in an interview that humanity was eradicated by an airborne biological weapon, a scenario inspired by the Alistair MacLean novel The Satan Bug. This is alluded to in the game's opening sequence, which shows a tapestry depicting humans fleeing from a giant microbe. The developers also explored the idea of humans living in a lunar base, alluded to in-game.

== Release ==
The game was released in 1994, then ported to the Macintosh. The German version Erben der Erde: Die große Suche was published by Softgold and first released as a port to the Amiga, followed by the MS-DOS version.

In 1996 the German computer magazine with CD "Bestseller Games #10" brought 300,000 units of ITE on the German market as budget release.

In 2000 the former Dreamers Guild co-founder Joe Pearce started a new company, Wyrmkeep Entertainment. In 2002 Pearce acquired the rights for the game, and self-published Inherit the Earth on his website for Windows and macOS. The full version was offered for $20 via PayPal and Kagi.com, while a free demo was downloadable.

In late 2004 Pearce provided the ScummVM developers with the source code of Inherit the Earth's SAGA engine (Scripts for Animated Graphic Adventures), which made ports to alternative platforms, like Linux, possible. In March 2007, a Pocket PC edition was released, followed by a port to the iPad in 2010.

The game was released digitally on GOG.com and Steam in June 2013.

== Reception ==
Computer Gaming World in August 1994 rated Inherit the Earth 2.5 stars out of five. While praising the graphics' "storybook charm" the reviewer stated that the game had too many mazes and fetch quests "tacked in order to extend its limited game play". He reported an "abrupt", incomplete ending and concluded that the game's "puzzles were given the least amount of attention". The game was reviewed in 1994 in Dragon #209 by Sandy Petersen in the "Eye of the Monitor" column. Petersen gave the game 2 out of 5 stars. Amiga Games issue 9/95 gave 92% and ASM issue 10/94 gave 10/12 points.

James V. Trunzo reviewed Inherit the Earth in White Wolf #48 (Oct., 1994), rating it a 4 out of 5 and stated that "Whether you like Inherit the Earth is definitely a matter of taste. One look at the game box should tell whether it's for you or not. What you see on the front and what you read on the back is exactly what you get."

According to Joe Pearce of The Dreamers Guild, Inherit the Earth was a commercial flop, but the game has some loyal following in the furry fandom.

According to Lisa Jennings, concept artist and animator for the game, the game struggled from combining a serious and detailed plot with anthropomorphic animals, a theme usually associated with children's entertainment:

Our biggest conflict was simple: the developers wanted something that was rather adult in nature. The publishers saw animals and equated it with children, and so forced us at every turn to cater to the 8-12 range, up to and including removing any death scenes to keep a Children's Rating.

— in an Interview with furryvideogames.org

== Legacy ==
According to one of the original artists and animators, Lisa Jennings, the game ends on a "To be continued" note, as it was originally intended to be part of a trilogy, which did not happen due to conflicts between the developer and publisher.

The story of the video game is continued in the official webcomic, Inherit the Earth, which takes place ten months after the events of the game. The webcomic is drawn by Allison Hershey, the game's original art designer, and co-written by Joe Pearce, the owner of Wyrmkeep Entertainment.

In January 2013 a Kickstarter crowdfunding campaign for the development of a sequel was initiated by Wyrmkeep Entertainment, but the funding goal was not met. A second campaign was started in July 2014 with a higher goal to account for adding voice acting to the project. This campaign was also unsuccessful. In March 2015, a Patreon funding drive was launched, with the aim to help finish funding the sequel's first of three chapters. This Patreon was intended to lead into another Kickstarter drive, with the base goal undetermined, but stated to be under $30,000.
