= Labyrinthine (board game) =

1977 fantasy board game

Labyrinthine is a fantasy board game published by Wee Warriors in 1977. Based on themes taken from the then-newly published Dungeons & Dragons, Labyrinthine was the first "dungeon crawler" board game to use a totally modular board that was reconfigured for each game.

Cover of first edition, 1977

Cover of second printing

== Description ==
Labyrinthine is a two-player game that was designed by Pete and Judy Kerestan. The cover art was created by Brad Schenck using his pseudonym "Morno". The first printing published by Wee Warriors featured an orange cover. A second printing used the same artwork on a yellow cover but used a more professional title font and added the words "Wee Warriors".

The game comes as a four-page rulebook that also includes:

- 15 paper sheets of room and hallway tiles
- a paper sheet of counters (heroes, guards, monsters, doors, and panels)

Game historian Marco Arnaudo noted the game's reliance on the tropes of the then-new role-playing game Dungeons & Dragons, particularly the dungeon maze and the Tolkienesque character races (elves, dwarves, and hobbits). Arnaudo also noted obvious similarities to the game Citadel, published by Fantasy Games Unlimited the previous year, where a group of heroes enters the castle of an evil wizard to recover a stolen artifact. But while Citadel used a map composed of six large tiles pre-printed with rooms and hallways, Labyrinthine took the concept a step further by using dozens of smaller tiles to create rooms and hallways, thereby becoming "the first fully modular dungeon-crawl game." Arnaudo credits Labyrinthine as an important stepping stone to more advanced "dungeon crawlers" such as The Sorcerer's Cave (1978) and The Mystic Wood (1980), which both use terrain tiles to create the board.

== Setting ==
A group of adventurers must enter the dungeon of an Evil Wizard in order to rescue a princess. One player takes on the roles of the adventurers, the other is the evil wizard.

== Set-up ==
The room and hallway tiles and the counters must be cut apart. Since they are only printed on paper, the rulebook suggests that all of these should be glued to cardstock to make them sturdier and easier to pick up.

Using all of the available room and hallway tiles, the player taking the part of the Evil Wizard sets up the dungeon in any configuration, then places doors and shifting panels to allow entry to the rooms. The Princess counter is placed face-up in the final room. The monsters are placed facedown in rooms, one monster per room. Guards are placed facedown in hallways. There is also a "Dummy Guard" counter that is also placed facedown in a hallway.

== Gameplay ==
Hero Phase

1. Movement: Each character can move up to their rated speed, usually 3. If the character can "see" a guard down the hallway, the guard's counter is flipped faceup.
  1. Open door/panel: If a character is adjacent to a panel or door, it can attempt to open it on the roll of a six-sided die compared to their ability. If a monster is in the room that has just been opened, the counter is flipped faceup.
2. Magic: Some characters have a spell they can employ. For example an Elf can turn invisible for 5 turns per game, and a Magic User can cast three fireballs per game.
3. Melee:
  1. The Heroes can attack any monster or guard to which they are adjacent.
  2. The monsters and guards are given an opportunity to counterattack any Hero adjacent to them.

Evil Wizard Phase

1. Move one guard or the Dummy Guard in any hallway
2. Move any Guard so that it can "see" a Hero.
3. Alarm Bell: The Evil Wizard player rolls a six-sided die for each guard beside a door.
4. Move Guards: If the player rolled a 6 for any guard beside a door, the guard hears the Heroes and moves towards them.
5. Melee
  1. The monsters and guards can attack any Hero adjacent to them
  2. The Heroes can counterattack

=== Combat resolution ===
Each counter has a defensive rating from A to D, and a numerical attack rating from 1-7. Before rolling dice, the attacker consults the Combat Resolution Table and cross-references the Defensive Rating of the target against the attack value of the attacker, resulting in a value ranging from 4 to 12. The attacker must equal or exceed this number using two six-sided dice. The rules do not specify how much damage is done by each hit.

=== Rescuing the princess ===
Once the Heroes reach the Princess, she becomes a member of the party, which then must retrace its steps to the entrance.

== Victory conditions ==
If the Heroes successfully escape from the dungeon with the Princess, the Heroes win. If the Evil Wizard's monsters and guards succeed in killing all of the Heroes, or kill the Princess after she joins the Heroes, then the Evil Wizard wins.

== Reception ==
In the April–May 1978 edition of White Dwarf (Issue #6), Don Turnbull thought Labyrinthine was inferior to its predecessory Citadel on all counts, saying, "The Presentation is inferior to that of Citadel: the rules are less detailed and less well presented than those of Citadel: the game components are qualitatively inferior to those of Citadel: the game is less interesting in play than is Citadel."

In a 2016 retrospective look at the game, Marco Arnaudo noted that Labyrinthine was another step in the evolution of the dungeon-crawl board game, saying that it "adds more detail compared to Citadel" although it is still "clearly based on Dungeons & Dragons and Chainmail." However, he called the necessity of building an entire dungeon "a logistical problem. The map is too large, and therefore takes too long to set up. During set up, the other player has nothing to do." He also noted that once the dungeon was set up, the Hero player could easily and instantly see the shortest path to the Princess. Arnaudo concluded that despite its place in the evolution of dungeon-crawler board games, playing Labyrinthine was laborious, and called the game "very uninteresting to play... Dry, monotonous, and repetitive."
