= NEOchrome =

Raster graphics editor

- v1.0 showing color cycling waterfall from 1985
- Original authors: Dave Staugas (programmer), Jim Eisenstein (programmer), Jerome Domurat (User Interface Designer)
- Developer: Atari Corporation
- Release: 1985; 41 years ago
- Stable release: 1.0
- Written in: Assembly
- Operating system: Atari ST
- Type: bitmap graphics editor

NEOchrome is an early color bitmap graphics editor for the Atari ST. It was written by Dave Staugas, a programmer at Atari Corporation and co-author of the ST's operating system. NEOchrome supports hardware-supported color cycling to give the impression of animation. A color cycling waterfall, created with NEOchrome, was one of the iconic images of the early Atari ST.

Following in the footsteps of MacPaint and the Apple II version Mouse Paint, both released in 1984, NEOchrome uses the then-novel representation of painting tools by icons (in addition to other GUI elements).

A pre-release version (v0.5) was included with the system disks of the first STs. Version 1.0 arrived later and was bundled with several versions of the ST. Although not officially public domain, this version was often treated as such, and was never actually sold. NEOchrome enjoyed a relatively high level of popularity within the ST community, even in the face of more advanced packages such as DEGAS and Deluxe Paint.

== NEOchrome Master ==
Although there were no further official versions, an unofficial revision called NEOchrome Master was released by the Atari demo scene group Delta Force's Till Bubeck (programmer of The Return of Medusa) in the early 1990s.

NEOchrome Master was built by disassembling the binary program "NEOchrome 1.0". The resulting source code was uncommented and hard to read, but could be assembled back into the same binary program as before. This allowed the author to extend the program.
