= Bradley W. Schenck =

American artist and game designer

Bradley W. Schenck is an American artist and game designer.

Schenck's art is widely recognized for its strong themes and rigorous structure applied to fantastic subjects that is reminiscent of the work of members of the Pre-Raphaelite Brotherhood. His work has been strongly influenced by traditional Celtic art and the Art Nouveau style. Nonetheless, while his style contains elements and motifs from these styles, Schenck has developed a style which includes a wide range of elements from art both classic and modern which he executes with his own strong sense of line and space.

== Early work ==
Schenck began his work as an artist at an early age, as a result of moving out of his parents' home to live on his own at the age of 14. He had a strong network of friends that assisted him through his connections in the Society for Creative Anachronism and the role playing game community. He also had a strong work ethic and was stubbornly self-reliant.

Some of Schenck's earliest published work can be found in the Arduin role playing game book Welcome to Skull Tower. Schenck's early work can often be identified by his artist's signature "Morno" or the sigil of the moon with an inscribed letter 'M.' All of the art in this volume was produced by Schenck except for a couple of pieces produced by Erol Otus. Schenck's work also appeared in other role playing game publications of the day. His early work displays Schenck's strong sense of scene composition, dramatic shading, and effective use of line weight. However, at this point there is still some uncertainty in his execution of form.

This changed rapidly, however, as the work presented in The Runestaff and various publications of the Society for Creative Anachronism in the early 1980s attests. His control over form, particularly of people, had improved dramatically. During this time his command of further detail in his work grew with each piece produced. For example, with one piece he became unsatisfied with an idealized presentation of the moon. He reworked the piece after researching the actual appearance of the moon in different phases to present the moon in the piece with a realistic appearance which also bore the stamp of his personal style. During this time his artist signature changed to his monogram: 'BWS'.

Much of his work during this time was sold at science fiction conventions and private auctions. Among the most popular of his pieces were watercolors of line art originals. During this time, his pieces often presented moody scenes of stylized Celts in dramatic landscapes, as opposed to his earlier compositions of fairly conventionalized high fantasy motifs. The character expressed in his human forms also became deeper and more expressive, evoking a strong sense of the artist's emotion.

Morno used the company name Cosmic Frog Productions, and advertised it beginning in 1975, for anyone wanting "fantasy and legendary illustration". He worked for Pete Kerestan as the artist for his company Wee Warriors; one of the company's wargames, Dragonlord (1977), was designed by Morno and thus co-production with Cosmic Frog.

== Cold Iron ==
A major commercial project for Schenck in the mid-1980s was the layout, design, and art of the songbook Cold Iron, in which Leslie Fish sets Rudyard Kipling's poems to music. The book was published by Off-Centaur Publications in 1983 and 1987. Schenck also did art for the Centaur Pillow Book, which contained erotic illustrations of fantastic creatures.

== Commodore 64 ==
Schenck's involvement with computers grew when he obtained a Commodore 64. His involvement with the gaming community became very deep very quickly, and is displayed in various ways, including his Emily Patella comic for the New Zork Times of Spring 1989.

He wrote several utility programs for the 64, including software for selecting the appropriate strings for a Celtic harp. He also experimented with computer graphics on this system, producing his earliest computer art. Among his experiments were designs for software which would display graphically stunning banner pages at key points in adventure games that Schenck designed, comparable to the cut scenes of later software.

The C64 was not the most crude computer medium Brad has worked with. The IBM PC's CGA graphics were significantly less sophisticated, yet Brad managed to create stunning images for this system for the game Mind-Roll by Epyx.

== Harp design and manufacture ==
Schenck turned his hand to the making of Celtic harps for several years in the late 1980s. He learned the craft under the tutelage of Jay Witcher). His harps were known for their excellent sound and beautiful decoration, but Schenck decided to leave the business as too much of the work was rote manufacturing that did not allow him to express himself artistically as much as he hoped to do.

== Amiga ==
The introduction of the Amiga provided an affordable computer platform with which Schenck was able to express himself artistically. Schenck used an Amiga 500 to develop demos for the Amiga Killer Demo Contest. He won the contest for three years running, obtaining better hardware with which to work as well as opportunities to apply his art to computer games for a number of different developers.

== The Labyrinth of Time ==
After a number of successful projects Schenck sought to work on a project over which he could have greater creative control. For this project, he returned to his role playing game roots on the computer with The Labyrinth of Time. He formed company Terra Nova Development with veteran programmer Michal Todorovic. The game was published by Electronic Arts and received moderate success, though it earned little revenue for the partners of Terra Nova Development. It is considered a classic today, both for its story line and for Schenck's art, and has been ported to current systems and re-released by Wyrmkeep Entertainment.

== Thousand Oaks Library Mural ==
Schenck painted a mural for the children's area of the public library in Thousand Oaks, California. It features characters from many famous children's books done in Schenck's distinctive style, wound into a single expansive composition which features images of children entering the piece at floor level. The unveiling of the mural featured a performance by Schenck's friend, musician Patrick Ball.

== Computer graphics work ==
Schenck has gone on to do further computer graphics work, including Star Trek: Starfleet Command III, Halls of the Dead: Faery Tale Adventure II, Dinotopia, I Have No Mouth, and I Must Scream, Return to Zork and Spirit of Excalibur.

== Current work ==
Schenck has retired from computer game graphics and has decided to use the web as a medium for producing interactive books. His favored theme is presently retro-futuristic. This theme can be seen in much of his prior work as well, such as the scenes of The Labyrinth of Time that are placed in the future. His current projects can be seen at his website, webomator.com.

Much of Schenck's prior work can likewise be seen on his personal website.

== See also ==
- Retro-futurism
- Cinemaware
- The Three Stooges (video game)
