= Faery Tale Adventure II: Halls of the Dead =

1997 action role-playing video game

- Developer: The Dreamers Guild
- Publisher: Encore Software
- Platforms: MS-DOS, Windows
- Release: August 1997
- Genre: Action role-playing
- Mode: Single-player

Faery Tale Adventure II: Halls of the Dead is a video game developed by American studio The Dreamers Guild and published by Encore Software in 1997 for MS-DOS and Microsoft Windows. It is the sequel to the 1987 game The Faery Tale Adventure. It was the last game developed by The Dreamers Guild before the studio's closure.

== Gameplay ==
Faery Tale Adventure II: Halls of the Dead is a game in which brothers strong Julian, agile Phillip, and wise Kevin continue their fight against the evil forces of the world.

== Development ==
The game was showcased at E3 1997.

== Reception ==
Reception

Review scores
Publication	Score
Computer Games Strategy Plus	3/5
Next Generation	2/5
PC Gamer (US)	55%

Next Generation gave the MS-DOS version two stars out of five, and stated "All in all, unless your desire for adventure outweighs your desire for a game with a sane interface, give this one a miss." Michael Wolf of PC Gamer US was similarly unimpressed, writing that "hungry roleplaying fans will have to wait for the next offering to come along." In Computer Games Strategy Plus, Robert Mayer was moderately more positive, but still found the game flawed.
