= BlackJack Academy =

1988 gambling video game

- Developer: Westwood Associates
- Publisher: MicroIllusions
- Platforms: Amiga, Apple IIGS, Commodore 64, MS-DOS
- Release: 1988
- Genre: Gambling
- Modes: Single-player, multiplayer

BlackJack Academy is a 1988 video game published by MicroIllusions.

== Gameplay ==
BlackJack Academy is a game in which the player learns how to play blackjack through a simulation in a casino environment.

== Reception ==
Roy Wagner reviewed the game for Computer Gaming World, and stated that "This program is a good example of software that can be used for recreational fun, serious study, and possibly financial profit (or loss). The graphics and sound are at a quality level. The user interface is excellent. If you like playing blackjack or want to learn more about the game, this program is for you."
