= The Labyrinth of Time =

1993 video game

- Developers: Terra Nova Development; The Wyrmkeep Entertainment Co. (re-release)
- Publishers: Electronic Arts; The Wyrmkeep Entertainment Co. (re-release)
- Designer: Bradley W. Schenck
- Programmer: Michal Todorovic
- Platforms: CDTV CD32, MS-DOS; Re-release; Amiga, Linux, Classic Mac OS, OS X, Windows, iPhone, iPod Touch
- Release: MS-DOS, CD32, Mac; June 1, 1993; Linux, OS X, Windows; December 7, 2004 iPhone, iPod Touch; November 14, 2009
- Genre: Graphic adventure
- Mode: Single-player

The Labyrinth of Time is a graphic adventure video game published by Electronic Arts for MS-DOS, Amiga CD32, and Classic Mac OS in 1993. It was created by Terra Nova Development, a team composed of Bradley W. Schenck and Michal Todorovic. The game was intended to be the first in a series, but its reception very mixed and no further games were produced.

The Labyrinth of Time was re-released for Windows, OS X, and Linux in 2004, then iPhone and iPod Touch in 2009, by The Wyrmkeep Entertainment Co. in collaboration with the original developers.

== Plot ==
The story of The Labyrinth of Time is loosely based on Greek mythology. The game begins during the player's commute home from work. While aboard the subway, the player and their train car are suddenly sucked into an alternate dimension. An illusion in the form of the mythological character Daedalus explains that King Minos has forced him to oversee the construction of a labyrinth that spans the space-time continuum. Upon its construction, King Minos will invade and conquer all times and places with his supernatural powers. Daedalus pleads for the player to find a way to destroy the labyrinth before Minos can complete his conquest.

In-game terminals and journal entries reveal the extent of Minos's power. As explained by the lone archivist on a lunar library, a figure identifying himself as the king appeared simultaneously to all world governments in all time periods, seizing control of their militaries and erasing all written history. Minos's new abilities seem to extend beyond time travel; the scene of the king's tomb strongly implies that he rose from the grave.

The Maze Center

The labyrinth that the player explores spans many time periods and locations. Despite their incongruity, each area is thematically connected by the story of Martin Garret, a professor intrigued with discovering the tomb of the unnamed Sorcerer-King at a far-off ziggurat near Uxmal. Desperado Mad Dog Maddigan, the one man who knew the location of the Sorcerer-King's treasure chamber, was buried in the Western town of Revolver Springs, California, along with a map to the ziggurat's chamber. Revolver Springs, however, was destroyed in a fire on May 1, 1882, leaving the location of his grave a mystery. Garret was about to begin his second expedition to the ziggurat, but suffered from anxiety after losing his lucky shirt in a previous dig.

When the player finds the ziggurat, they can retrieve the shirt. They are also able to go back in time to Revolver Springs and pick up a newspaper explaining that the local graves were relocated to make way for a railroad extension project. The player leaves both for Garret to receive, changing history. With the encouragement and new information, Garret locates Mad Dog Maddigan and completes his expedition. Among the treasures brought back from the Sorcerer-King's tomb, Garret discovers a talisman that was reputedly used to destroy buildings.

The player must operate three levers in the ziggurat to reach the center of the labyrinth and take, among other items, the talisman to destroy its keystone. After dispelling an illusory Minotaur guarding the Maze Center, the player breaks the maze's keystone. This causes the labyrinth to unfurl at the seams. Daedalus appears in person to offer thanks for his freedom, then leaves to ensure King Minos can do no more harm. He leaves the player floating in an area that does not exist in time or space.

The game ends with a teaser for a sequel, The Labyrinth II: Lost in the Land of Dreams, but the sequel was never produced.

== Re-release ==
The Labyrinth of Time was re-released by The Wyrmkeep Entertainment Co. for Windows, Mac OS, AmigaOS, and Linux in December 2004. The new versions restore some audio quality and add a breadcrumbs feature for navigating mazes. The game now usess the Simple DirectMedia Layer.

An Amiga version was released as freeware.

iPhone and iPod Touch versions were released in November 2009.

== Reception ==
Computer Gaming World's Charles Ardai in December 1993 admitted that expecting The Labyrinth of Time to not have a maze was unrealistic, but stated that although "pretend[ing] to be a piece of interactive fiction", it was "almost nothing but mazes, linked end to end in a complex, irritating chain". Ardai criticized the "relentless stylish visuals" as "eye-candy and boring eye-candy at that", with no way to distinguish between the few objects necessary for gameplay and the many non-interactive ones. He advised Electronic Arts to "dismantle The Labyrinth of Time and sell it cut-rate for clip art". In April 1994 the magazine said that "though mythology and time travel interbreed seamlessly, its depressingly empty world and staid adventure game mechanics create a game that is less than timeless".

In 1996, Computer Gaming World declared Labyrinth of Time the 43rd-worst computer game ever released.

In January 1994, PC Gamer UK awarded the game its "Recommended" seal, with reviewer Phil South giving it a 91% rating. South defined the game as quick, hot and deep: "Quick because it takes no time at all to get into [...]. Hot because its state-of-the-art presentation because it makes it both look good and sound like a million bucks [...]. Deep because, once you get over the initial novelty and start to want something to occupy you for a while, the game has enough bite to keep you enthralled for as long as you're prepared to put the effort in, with puzzles and problems to tax experienced and neophyte adventurers alike".

In February 1994, PC Zone also recommended the game, giving it a score of 89 out of 100. Reviewer Paul Presley criticized the game's "less than user-friendly interface", stating that there's "far too many mouse clicks to do far too few things", while highly praised the visuals and sound, which "produce an atmosphere unrivalled in an adventure game since The 7th Guest".

The One gave the Amiga version of The Labyrinth of Time an overall score of 81%, and praised its graphics and music, but was more critical to some issues in its gameplay. The One expressed that the "packaging itself gives no indication of the down-beat nature of the game ... [the intro outlining backstory events] come as an unpleasant surprise" and criticized the mazes, stating that the auto-map negates their purpose, making them "nothing more than tedious", and were frustrated by the "dated" and "limiting" UI.

James V. Trunzo reviewed The Labyrinth of Time in White Wolf #42 (April, 1994), giving it a final evaluation of "Poor" and stated that "The Labyrinth of Time might appeal to you if you're obsessed with finding your way through maze after maze. It doesn't have much appeal for higher tastes. I've got to label this one a 'must... to avoid'."
