= Palace of the Vampire Queen =

First stand-alone fantasy RPG adventure

- Authors: Pete Kerestan and Judy Kerestan
- First published: 1976

Palace of the Vampire Queen is a fantasy role-playing game adventure published by Wee Warriors in 1976 that uses the rules of Dungeons & Dragons, despite not being licensed by TSR, the creators of D&D. It is notable for being the first stand-alone role-playing adventure to be published.

== Contents ==
Palace of the Vampire Queen is a simple scenario for TSR's D&D game set on the isle of Baylor in the Misty Isles archipelago. A vampire queen has kidnapped a dwarven princess, and the heroes must rescue the princess. The vampire's palace is a five-level dungeon; some rooms contain monsters, while other rooms are empty. The adventure includes a complete map for the gamemaster, and a blank map for the players to fill in as they explore. As RPG historian Stu Horvath noted, "Everything is static; the occupants of the rooms wait for the players to arrive in order to react. Several rooms have detailed descriptions of furniture and other contents, implying that the rooms labeled 'Empty' are literally empty."

== Publication history ==
Palace of the Vampire Queen was written by Pete and Judy Kerestan, with art by Brad Schenck under his pseudonym "Morno". It was published as 15 loose-leaf sheets and an outer folder. The authors sold their product out of the trunk of their car to begin with, but soon negotiated an arrangement with TSR where, although it was an unlicensed product, TSR exclusively distributed it to promote sales of D&D. This made Palace of the Vampire Queen one of the first four Wee Warriors products to be widely sold as a result. Occasionally copies of the adventure would arrive at TSR missing a page, and TSR staff would add a photocopy of the missing page to the package.

Palace of the Vampire Queen was the first published standalone role-playing game adventure. TSR's adventure Temple of the Frog was published a year prior and thus was the first published RPG adventure, it was included in the D&D Blackmoor expansion booklet, rather than as a stand-alone adventure; TSR did not publish any stand-alone adventures until 1978.

Wee Warriors published a second edition in 1976 that consisted of either 17 or 24 loose-leaf sheets — sometimes pages were printed double-sided, sometimes only single-sided. The third and fourth printings in 1976 were 13 double-sided loose-leaf pages.

Wee Warriors followed up in 1977 with a second adventure set on Baylor, Dwarven Glory, which was also distributed by TSR.

However, late in 1977, the rapidly growing TSR stopped distributing third-party merchandise, and the fifth printing of Palace of the Vampire Queen took the form of a pamphlet-sized 30-page center-bound book that was distributed by Wee Warriors. The sixth and final edition, also distributed by Wee Warriors, was a 28-page pamphlet-sized book with a cardstock cover.

A third D&D adventure, Misty Isles, also set in the Misty Isles archipelago, was released in 1977 and was also distributed by Wee Warriors.

Wee Warriors ceased publication in 1978. In 2019, Precis Intermedia acquired the Wee Warriors product line, with a re-release of Palace of the Vampire Queen as a remastered reprint.

== Reception ==
In his 2023 book Monsters, Aliens, and Holes in the Ground, RPG historian Stu Horvath noted, "In Palace of the Vampire Queen, nothing makes sense. The only context is provided in a one-page background that boils down to a couple of key facts, most of which were established by the title ... As with many novice dungeons designs, the palace seems to be populated the way it is because it might be neat, or might be fun, or in the case of the garlic garden, probably useful for the players." Horvath concluded, "Palace of the Vampire Queen proves that extremities of strangeness are really a baseline of the [role-playing game] hobby."

== Other reviews ==
- Panzerfaust and Campaign Number 77 January-February 1977
