= Surgat =

Minor demon

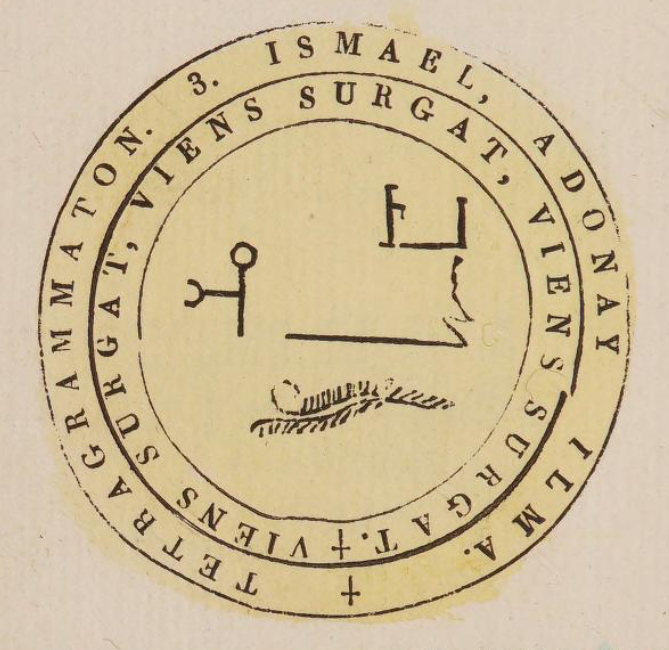
Sigil of Surgat from The Grimoire of Pope Honorius

Surgat (Latin: Surgat, lit. 'Rise') is a minor demon mentioned in The Grimoire of Pope Honorius, The Secrets of Solomon and the Grimorium Verum. He is listed as "Surgat who opens all locks." His angel opposite is Aquiel.

== In fiction ==
In Harlan Ellison's 1981 short story "Grail", Surgat is an important character, unlocking some of the barriers in the protagonist's path but at a terrible price.

He is also a character or mentioned in:

- I Have No Mouth, and I Must Scream (1995 video game)
- Death from a Top Hat (1938 novel) by Clayton Rawson
- Doomed Lensmen (1967 novella) by Sybly White (Lee Gold)
- Bird Box (2018 film)
- Insidious: The Last Key (2018 film)
- Anything for Jackson (2020 film)

== See also ==
- Christian demons in popular culture
