= Dr. Plummet's House of Flux =

1989 video game

- Developer: MicroIllusions
- Publisher: MicroIllusions
- Platform: Amiga
- Release: 1989

Dr. Plummet's House of Flux is a video game developed by MicroIllusions in 1989 for the Amiga.

== Plot ==
Dr. Plummet's House of Flux is a game in which the unusual Dr. Plummet has invited the player character to come to his House of Flux for a test of skills involving four different missions. Each mission has seven levels with a specific theme that determines the backgrounds and obstacles for each level. The player flies a ship with a gun and shield to save six captive astronauts from each level, avoiding or destroying obstacles placed by Dr. Plummet.

== Gameplay ==
The player operates the ship using a joystick. The player can rotate the ship either clockwise or counter-clockwise by moving the joystick either to the left or to the right, and can thrust the ship forward by pushing the joystick forward. The player can fire the guns on the ship using the joystick button, and raise the shields with the space bar. Running out of fuel causes the ship to rotate aimlessly.

== Reception ==
In 1990, Dragon gave the game 2 out of 5 stars.
