= Discovery 2.0 =

1990 video game developed by Sylvan Technical Arts

- Developer: Sylvan Technical Arts
- Publisher: MicroIllusions
- Release: 1990

Discovery 2.0 is a 1990 video game developed by Sylvan Technical Arts and published by MicroIllusions.

== Gameplay ==
Discovery 2.0 is a game in which the player moves through the levels of a spaceship by answering questions correctly. The game disk came with questions for math or spelling, with expansion disks for Trivia 1 and 2, Science, History, Geography, Spelling 1 and 2, Math 1 and 2, Math Concepts, Language, and Social Studies.

== Reception ==
Leah Wesolowski reviewed the game for Computer Gaming World, and stated that "As early as the original Discovery, reviewers thought the concept was good, but the implementation was poor. Nothing has really changed. With a new digitized voice, the ability to correct mathematical errors and a movement system in which characters didn't continually fall down hatches (easier than characters fall down ladders in Shadow of the Beast), the game might be worthwhile. As it is, Discovery 2.0 is only likely to make one scream."

Amazing Computer Magazine wrote that "Discovery, the award-winning educational program, has now become even better."
