= Wee Warriors =

Tabletop role-playing game publisher

Wee Warriors Ltd. was a game company formed shortly after the birth of role-playing games (RPGs) in the mid-1970s to publish RPG accessories. It was notable for publishing the first stand-alone adventure for the Dungeons & Dragons role-playing game, and for publishing the first character sheets for an RPG. The company thrived for several years while TSR distributed their unlicensed products. When TSR stopped distributing unlicensed materials, Wee Warriors tried diversifying, but ultimately ceased publication in 1978.

== History ==
When TSR's Dungeons & Dragons began its quick rise to popularity, Pete and Judy Kerestan of El Segundo, California formed Wee Warriors in 1975 to publish accessories for the new game. For two years, Wee Warriors produced a variety of innovative products related to the D&D RPG market, notably the first stand-alone adventure, and the first set of character sheets. Although they did not have a license to produce D&D accessories, their early products were both promoted and distributed by TSR.

Then in late 1977, with the release of the new Advanced Dungeons & Dragons rules, the rapidly expanding TSR stopped distributing third-party materials. Wee Warriors tried diversifying, designing a Star Trek board game, and promoting a new science fiction play-by-mail game. But the company was unable to regain traction in the marketplace, and ceased publication in 1978.

In 2019, the intellectual property rights of Wee Warriors were acquired by Precis Intermedia.

== Published material ==
=== D&D adventures ===
- Dungeon Master's Kit #1: Palace of the Vampire Queen (1976) - The first stand-alone RPG adventure module, set on the dwarven Isle of Baylor in the Misty Isles archipelago.) (Although TSR's Temple of the Frog was published a year prior and thus was the first RPG adventure, it was included in the Blackmoor expansion booklet, and was not a stand-alone adventure.) The first several printings were loose-leaf pages; later printings were in stapled pamphlet-sized booklet form.
- Dungeon Masters Kit #2: The Dwarven Glory (1977) - Another early adventure module also set on Baylor, although unrelated to the previous adventure.

For a time, TSR was the main distributor of the first two adventures, despite the fact that these were unlicensed products.

- Dungeon Master's Kit #3: Misty Isles (1977) - A third adventure module, this involved travel to the other islands of the archipelago. By this time, TSR was no longer distributing unlicensed products, and Wee Warriors became the distributor.

=== Games ===
- Labyrinthine (1977) - a two-player board game featuring a dungeon made up of dozens of modular tiles, a first.
- The Vanquished Foe (1977) - a two-player Dwarf versus Orc board game, set on the Isle of Baylor and thematically related to Wee Warriors' adventure modules.
- Dragonlord (1978) - A two-player board game where players are dragonlords - warriors who fight each other while mounted on dragonback.
- Embattled Trek - An unlicensed Star Trek board game
- Dog Tags — A two-person combat board game set in World War II at the infantry platoon level

=== RPG accessories ===
- The Character Archaic (1975) - Considered the first set of character sheets ever published. The first printing was distributed by TSR and was also advertised in the second printing of TSR's Gods, Demi-Gods and Heroes .
- The Endless Dungeon (1977) - a set of cardboard tiles that could be glued together to form floors and walls for use with miniatures. Originally distributed by TSR.
- The Village (1977) - a set of houses on cardboard that could be assembled.
- Dungeon Designer's Kit - A set of cardstock sheets with dungeon rooms and furnishings printed on them.
- Game Designer's Kit (1977)

=== Play-by-mail (PBM) game ===
- Planet Master - A science fiction PBM

=== Metal miniatures ===
For a time, Wee Warriors also produced large 54 mm metal fantasy miniatures for use in role-playing games.
