= Deluxe Paint Animation =

Graphics editor

DeluxePaint Animation
- Developer: Electronic Arts
- Release: 1990; 36 years ago
- Stable release: 1.0 / 1990; 36 years ago
- Operating system: MS-DOS
- Type: Bitmap graphics editor
- License: Proprietary

DeluxePaint Animation is a 1990 graphics editor and animation creation package for MS-DOS, based on Deluxe Paint for the Amiga. It was adapted by Brent Iverson with additional animation features by Steve Shaw and released by Electronic Arts.

The program requires VGA graphics, MS-DOS 2.1 or higher, and a mouse.

== Features ==
Listed from the back of the box.

- Complete selection of painting tools — Draw any shape you want, any way you want.
- Turn any image into a brush. You can rotate, flip, shear, resize, smear, and shade it.
- 7 levels of magnification — Paint in magnified mode if you want. Use variable zoom for detailed editing at the pixel level.
- 3-D perspective — Move and rotate images in full 3-D, automatically.
- Use color cycling and gradient fills to create great special effects.
- Stencils — Protect your designs from the slip of the hand or a bad idea. A stencil masks your image so you can paint "behind" and "in front of" it.
- Use the handy Move Dialog to animate brushes in full 3-D — automatically! Ideal for creating spinning titles for low-cost videos.
- 37 multi-sized fonts
