= Brilliance (graphics editor) =

Graphics editor for the Amiga

- Other names: TrueBrilliance
- Developer(s): Digital Creations
- Initial release: 1993; 32 years ago
- Final release: Brilliance 2 / 1994; 31 years ago
- Operating system: AmigaOS
- Platform: Amiga
- Type: bitmap graphics editor
- License: Proprietary

Brilliance is a bitmap graphics editor for the Amiga computer, published by Digital Creations in 1993. Although marketed as a single package, Brilliance in reality consisted of two separate (but near identical-looking) applications. One was a palette-based package also named Brilliance. The other was a true-color package called TrueBrilliance.

The Brilliance package was one of the major rivals to Deluxe Paint, the established "killer app" in Amiga bitmap graphics editing.

At its launch, Brilliance attracted generally favorable reviews. One commonly noted point was TrueBrilliance's performance on Hold-and-Modify and true-color images, which was significantly faster than that of Deluxe Paint IV. However, despite being faster and easier to use than Deluxe Paint, Brilliance never achieved the same level of popularity. It may be significant that (in contrast to Deluxe Paint) by the time of Brilliance's launch, the Amiga market was already in serious decline.

TrueBrilliance was notable for its ability to edit true 15 and 24-bit color images, even on older Amigas which could only display HAM-6 (pseudo-12-bit color) graphics. In such cases, the image was rendered as a HAM display, but all modifications were performed on the underlying true color image buffer. Even when the final image was intended for HAM display, this had the advantage that successive operations did not accumulate HAM artifacts on top of each other. Loss of quality could be restricted to a single HAM conversion at the end of the process.

== Releases ==
Brilliance/TrueBrilliance was released in 1993, and came with a dongle.

Brilliance/TrueBrilliance 2 came out the following year, in 1994 and dropped the requirement for the dongle. Some reviewers considered the changes in functionality overall to be minor, given the new major release number. However, the significant drop in price of the new version was positively received.

== See also ==
- Deluxe Paint
- Photon Paint
- GrafX2
