= The Dragon Lord (Chivalry & Sorcery) =

Role-playing game supplement

The Dragon Lord is a 1984 fantasy role-playing game adventure for beginning player characters published by Fantasy Games Unlimited for the Chivalry & Sorcery role-playing game.

== Plot summary ==
A dragon attacks Barrisglen and kidnaps a princess visiting the town.

== Reception ==
Craig Sheeley reviewed The Dragon Lord in Space Gamer No. 72. Sheeley commented that "The Dragon Lord has all the earmarks of an adventure run by the author that someone decided to market, using the original jury-rigged materials from the game session! It's not worth [the price], being a fairly simple adventure that most any gamemaster could make up. I expected better from FGU."

Paul Mason reviewed The Dragon Lord for Imagine magazine, and stated that "there is sufficient depth to the adventure to give several sessions of play, and the plot is by no means as simple and clichéd as the brief outline I gave earlier might Imply. Further, since the adventure is in the form of a plotline, it means that if your campaign is close to the spirit of the Middle Ages, this scenario could be converted to most game systems with ease."
