= Dragonlord (board game) =

Board game

Dragonlord is a board game simulating aerial combat between flying dragons that was published by Wee Warriors in 1976.

== Publication history ==
Dragonlord (1977) is one of the wargames published towards the end of Wee Warriors as a company, and was designed and illustrated by Bradley W. Schenck under the pseudonym "Morno". Schenck had founded his own production company, Cosmic Frog, and Dragonlord was a Wee Warriors/Cosmic Frog co-production.

In 2019, the intellectual property rights were acquired by Precis Intermedia.

== Gameplay ==
Each player controls a flying dragon and its dragonlord rider. The purpose of the game is to be the last dragonlord in the air. In the basic scenario with only two dragonlords, the sequence of play is:

1. Movement: Each dragon moves. The dragon that moves last has the opportunity to attack first.
2. Dragon that moved last attacks.
3. Dragon that moved first attacks.

=== Combat ===
Each dragon can attack with either claw or fire, the dragonlords with either lance, sword or axe. In order to successfully hit during combat, the attacker rolls percentile dice and compares the result on a table against the defending dragon's previous aerial maneuver.

=== Scenarios ===
There are four scenarios in the game:

1. Single combat between two dragonlords
2. A village raid in which peasants firing arrows can join the fray
3. Open battle between small teams of dragonlords
4. Massed battle royale combat between many players

== Reception ==
In the August 1979 edition of Dragon (Issue #17), Glenn Williams found the artwork by designer Schenck to be "outstanding [...] The pictures convey the swirling blur of scales, claws and flame that I have imagined would be the nature of dragon combat." However, Williams did not like the map, which was not drawn from a top down (bird's-eye) point of view, but from the side, with the ground at the bottom of the board. Williams suggested this would cause "bitter feuds over whether or not you have clutched your opponent or plowed into a rocky slope." He also criticized the use of a square grid versus a hex grid on the map, and noted that gridlines on the cut and paste sections of the map did not line up properly. Williams found the combat rules complex, especially as more dragons are added to the fray. However, he concluded with a strong recommendation to buy, saying, "It is a very cost-effective way to literally add a new dimension to your fantasy boardgaming. [...] Buy the game, play it, add it to your other games and beware the stoop and clutch of the dragon who has risen above you!"
