= Deluxe Paint =

Raster graphics editor

- Deluxe Paint V box cover - OEM re-release on CD
- Developer: Electronic Arts
- Release: November 1985; 41 years ago
- Final release: 5.0 / 1995; 31 years ago
- Operating system: AmigaOS, GEM, MS-DOS, Apple GS/OS
- Platform: Amiga, MS-DOS, Atari ST, Apple IIGS
- Type: Bitmap graphics editor
- License: Proprietary

Deluxe Paint V on the Amiga, showing detail from The Birth of Venus, included as a sample picture starting with the first release in 1985

Deluxe Paint, often referred to as DPaint, is a bitmap graphics editor created by Dan Silva for Electronic Arts and published for the then-new Amiga 1000 in November 1985. A series of updated versions followed, some of which were ported to other platforms. An MS-DOS release with support for the 256 color VGA standard became popular for creating pixel graphics in video games in the 1990s.

Author Dan Silva previously worked on the Cut & Paste word processor (1984), also from Electronic Arts.

== History ==
Deluxe Paint began as an in-house art development tool called Prism. As author Dan Silva added features to Prism, it was developed as a showcase product to coincide with the Amiga's debut in 1985. Upon release, it was quickly embraced by the Amiga community and became the de facto graphics (and later animation) editor for the platform. Amiga manufacturer Commodore International later commissioned EA to create version 4.5 AGA to bundle with the new Advanced Graphics Architecture chipset (A1200, A4000) capable Amigas. Version 5 was the last release after Commodore's bankruptcy in 1994.

Early versions of Deluxe Paint were available in protected and non copy-protected versions, the latter retailing for a slightly higher price. The copy protection scheme was later dropped. Deluxe Paint was first in a series of products from the Electronic Arts Tools group—then later moved to the ICE (for Interactivity, Creativity, and Education) group—which included such Amiga programs as Deluxe Music Construction Set (preceded by Music Construction Set for the Apple II), Deluxe Video, and the Studio series of paint programs for the Mac.

With the development of Deluxe Paint, EA introduced the ILBM and ANIM file format standards for graphics. While widely used on the Amiga, these formats never gained widespread end user acceptance on other platforms, but were heavily used by game development companies. Deluxe Paint was used by LucasArts to make graphics for their adventure games such as The Secret of Monkey Island, and the name of a particular filename used to store the main protagonist Guybrush Threepwood was probably at the origin of his peculiar name. One of the main artist developer of the game, Mark Ferrari, in an interview for The Making of Monkey Island 30th Anniversary Documentary remembers that "there was a pulldown menu in DPaint called brushes, so character sprites were referred to as brushes", and the male protagonist was simply "the guy.brush" until the artist Steve Purcell suggested to take the very name "Guybrush". The author Ron Gilbert remembers that the PC DOS version of the file was named "guybrush.bbm".

== Versions ==
=== Amiga ===
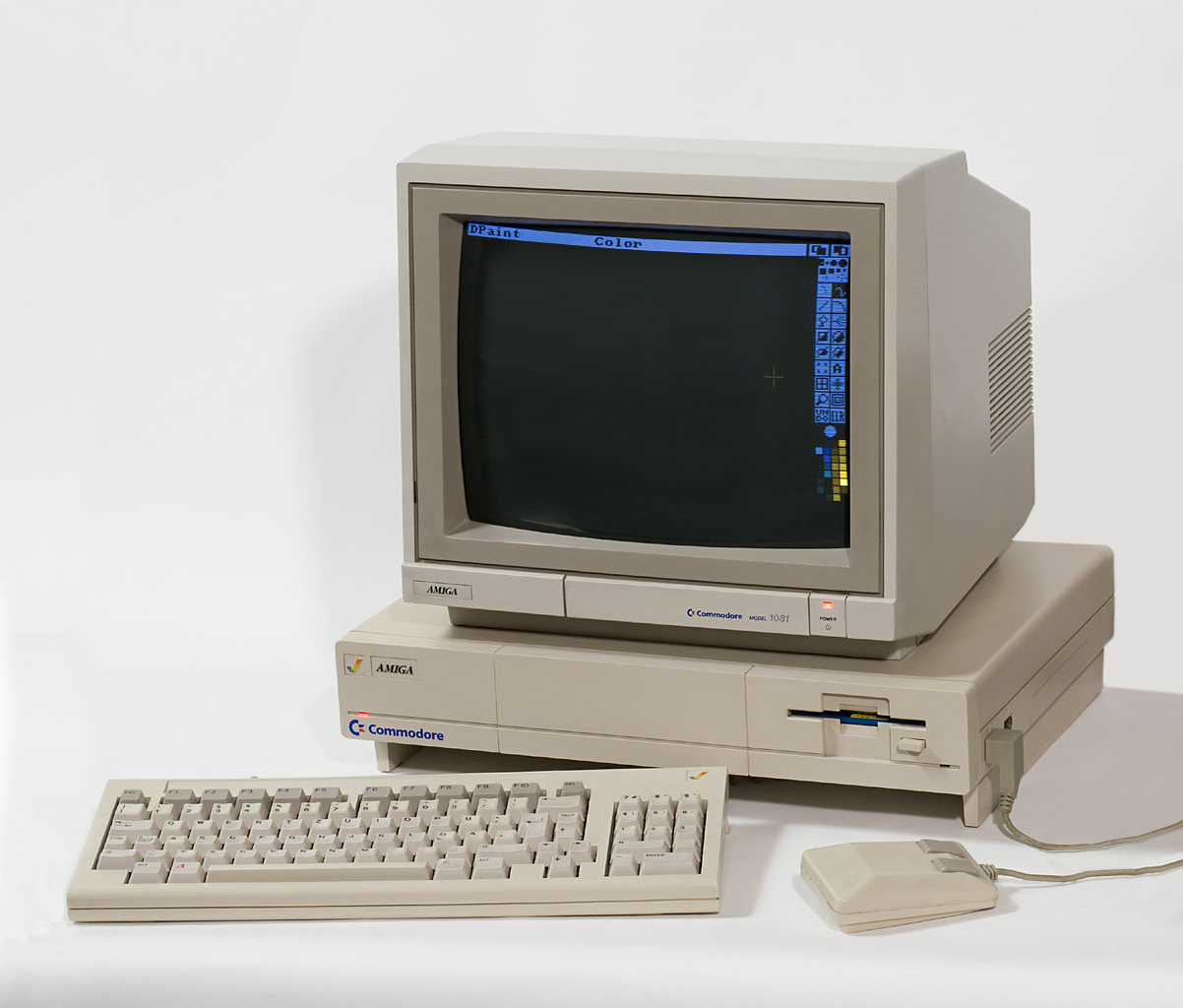
Deluxe Paint I on an Amiga 1000

DeluxePaint IV introduced AnimBrush-based morphing

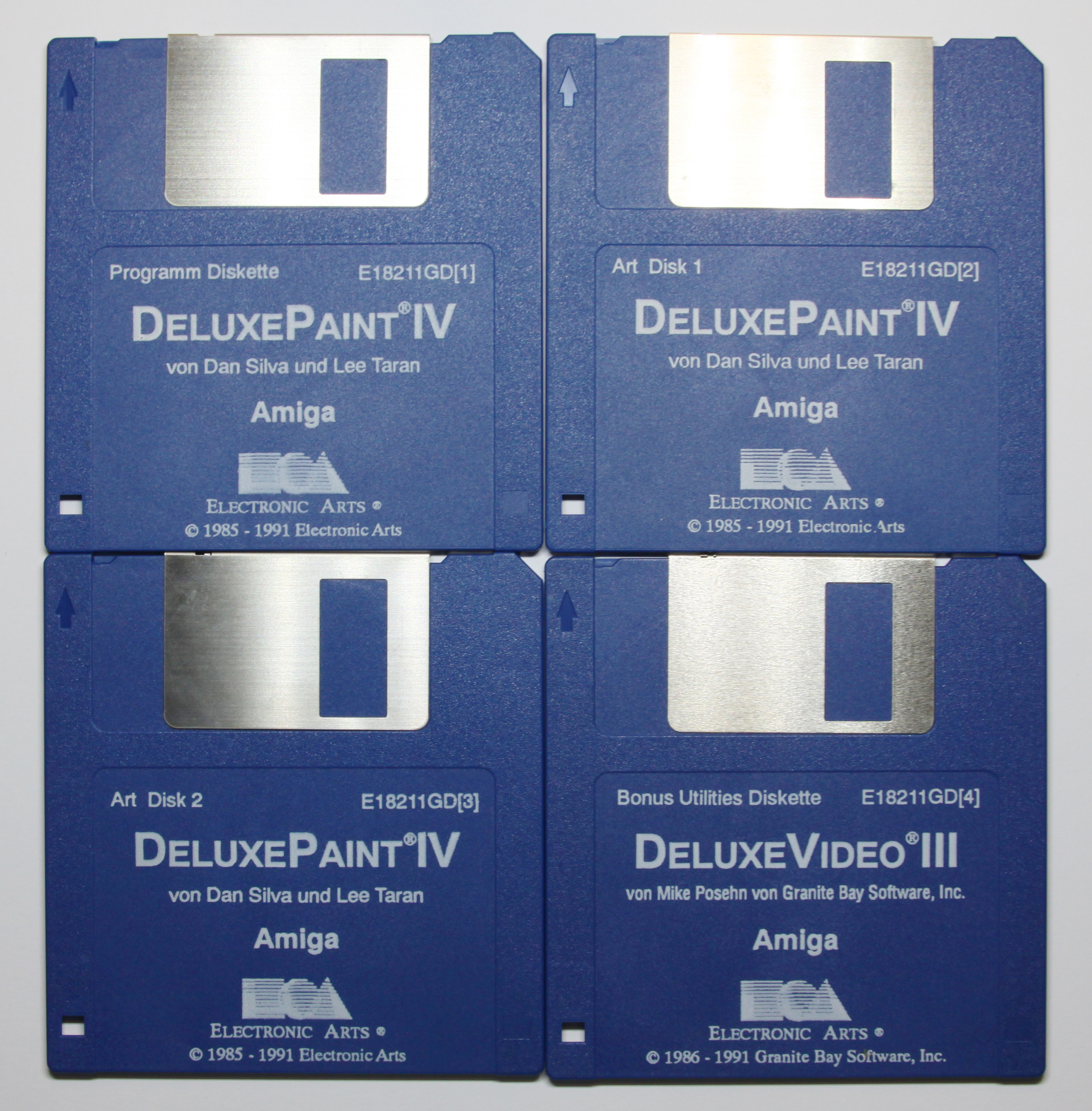
DeluxePaint IV floppy disks (German version)

Deluxe Paint I was released in 1985. A major feature was animation by using color cycling. The Amiga natively supports indexed color, where a pixel's color value does not carry any RGB hue information but instead is an index to a color palette (a collection of unique color values). By adjusting the color value in the palette, all pixels with that palette value change simultaneously in the image or animation, creating cyclic movement in the image. In the Christmas demo files on the Deluxe Paint I disk, this kind of animation (which is toggled by pressing the tab key) is used to depict falling snowflakes, a blinking Christmas tree, and a roaring fire in the fireplace.

In 1986, Deluxe Paint II was introduced, which added many convenient features such as pattern and gradient fill, which could be selected by right-clicking on a fill tool. An effects menu with e.g. perspective transformation was also added. The screen format could now be changed from a dedicated selection page.

Deluxe Paint III appeared in 1989 and added support for Extra Halfbrite. New editing modes allowed one to stencil certain colors to protect them, so it is possible to e.g. paint a landscape from front to back, with the foreground protected by a stencil. A major new feature of Deluxe Paint III was the ability to create cel-like animation, and animbrushes (1MB of RAM is needed for animation). These let the user pick up a section of an animation as an "animbrush", which can then be placed onto the canvas while it animates. Deluxe Paint III was one of the first paint programs to support animbrushes. This is similar to copy and paste, except one can pick up more than one image.

Deluxe Paint IV (introduced in 1991), which did not include Silva as the lead programmer, offered significant new features like non-bitplane-indexed Hold-and-Modify support for creating images with up to 4,096 colors. Animation support was improved by adding a light table, i.e. onion skinning, and AnimBrush morphing. The color mixer was now a HAM region at the bottom of the screen (instead of a floating window as before) and allowed mixing adjacent colors similar to a real palette.

Deluxe Paint 4.5 AGA appeared the following year, addressing the stability issues and providing support for the new A1200 and A4000 AGA machines and a revamped screen mode interface. It appeared in both standalone and Commodore-bundled versions.

The final release, Deluxe Paint V, in 1995, supported true 24-bit RGB images. However, using only the AGA native chipset, the 24-bit RGB color was only held in computer memory, the on-screen image was displayed in HAM8 (18-bit color).

=== Apple IIGS ===
DeluxePaint II for the Apple IIGS was developed by Brent Iverson and released in 1987.

=== MS-DOS ===
Deluxe Paint II for MS-DOS was released in 1988, It required MS-DOS 2.0 and 640 kB of RAM. It supports CGA, EGA, MCGA, VGA, Hercules and Tandy IBM PC-compatible graphic cards.

Deluxe Paint II Enhanced was released in 1989, requiring MS-DOS 2.11 and 640 kB of RAM. It supports resolutions up to 800x600 pixels with 256 colors.

Deluxe Paint II Enhanced 2.0, released in 1994, was the most successful MS-DOS version, and was compatible with PC Paintbrush PCX image files. The MS-DOS conversion was done by Brent Iverson with the enhanced features by Steve Shaw. It supports CGA, EGA, MCGA, VGA, Hercules, Tandy, and Amstrad video cards, as well as early Super VGA video cards enabling it to support up to 800 × 600 with 256 (from 262,144) colors and 1024 × 768 with 16 colors.

The sister product Deluxe Paint Animation (only for 320×200 pixels and 256 colors) was widely used, especially in video game development.

=== Atari ST ===
Deluxe Paint ST was developed by ArtisTech Development, published by Electronic Arts, and was released in 1990. It supports the Atari STE 4096 color palette and animated graphics.

Features advertised for the Atari ST version include 3D perspective, design your own fonts, mirror symmetry, multi-color airbrushing & animations, printing up to poster size, split-screen magnification with variable zoom, and working on animations (including multiple animations).

== Workflow ==
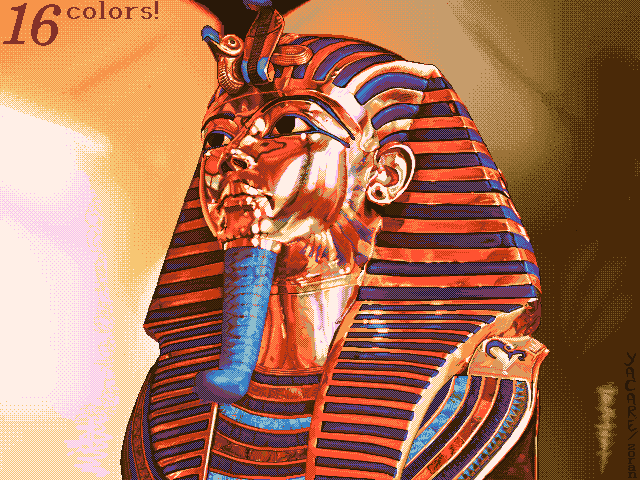
16-color image made with Deluxe Paint II for MS-DOS. Dithering is used to reduce color banding.

"[" and "]" hotkeys step through the indexed palette, turning indexed-pixel-painting into a fast two-handed mouse+keys process, and the right mouse button paints with the background color.

For example, transparency is obtained as simply as selecting a background color index (a single right click on the palette GUI to change). Colors could be locked from editing by use of a stencil (a list of color indices whose pixels should not be altered in the image data) and simple color-cycling animations could be created using contiguous entries in the palette. This was easy to change the hue and tone of a section of the image by altering the corresponding colors in the palette. (The specific section needed to use a dedicated part of the palette for this technique to work.)

Brushes can be cut from the background by using the box, freehand, or polygon selection tools. They can then be used in the same manner as any other brush or pen. This functionality is simpler to use than the "stamp" tool of Photoshop or Alpha Channels as provided in later programs. Brushes can be rotated and scaled, even in 3D. After a brush is selected, it appears attached to the mouse cursor, providing an exact preview of what will be drawn. This allows precise pixel positioning of brushes.

Animations stored in IFF ANIM format are delta compressed making animations both smaller and faster to playback.

== Reception ==
Compute! criticized the documentation of the first release of DeluxePaint as inadequate, but stated that "DeluxePaint is a visual arts program of immense scope and flexibility". In later versions the documentation was much improved; for instance DeluxePaint IV came with a 300-page manual.

Deluxe Paint was a hit for EA. The main line of the series, particularly installments one to three, has won a total of at least nine awards from independent publications and organizations, including three Amiga-specific awards. Deluxe Paint III also won Commodore International's Enterprise and Vision award in 1990, becoming the first software to win the award, for what the company's judges believed to be best utilizing the Amiga's graphical capabilities.

Deluxe Paint for Atari ST won multiple awards from the publication: ST Format for "Best Application Software Of 1990" and "Best Art/Graphics Package."

ST Format's Andrew Hutchinson writes, "It (Deluxe Paint) first appeared in November 1985 and soon more than 50 percent of all Amiga owners had a copy of the package. Since then it's undergone two revisions, but the current version available for the ST far outstrips all earlier incarnations. It's the best version there is!"

ST Review writes, "Amiga owners have been sniggering for years at basic packages like Neochrome and even the mighty Degas, as they tinkered with the enormously successful Deluxe Paint series. Now ST owners have their day."

Atari ST User's Simon Lawson gave Deluxe Paint the magazine's highest rating of "Excellent" for both "Features" and "Ease Of Use."

== Uses ==
Deluxe Paint was frequently used for making graphics for video games from the late 1980s to the mid-1990. Games developed with it include Another World, Dark Seed, Eye of the Beholder, The Secret of Monkey Island, Sim City 2000, Wolfenstein 3D, DOOM, and Quake.

The music video for the 2003 single "Move Your Feet" by Danish alternative dance duo Junior Senior was created entirely using the Amiga version of Deluxe Paint by the art collective Shynola.

The webcomic "Unicorn Jelly" by Jennifer Diane Reitz was completed over the course of three years using Deluxe Paint 2, one panel posted every night at midnight.

British author and artist Molly Cutpurse used Deluxe Paint to create the video graphics for the 1989 film Murder on the Moon, starring Brigitte Nielsen.

Deluxe Paint was used during production of the seaQuest DSV TV series (1993–1996) for most drawing, texturing, and for all screen graphics shown on the shipboard displays.

== Legacy ==
After leaving EA in 1989, Silva went on to join the Yost Group, which developed Autodesk's 3D Studio.

In 2015, Electronic Arts released the source code of "Deluxe Paint I" under a non-commercial license via the Computer History Museum for historical reasons.

== See also ==
- Deluxe Paint Animation
- Brilliance (graphics editor)
- GrafX2
- List of raster graphics editors
- Comparison of raster graphics editors
