= I Have No Mouth, and I Must Scream (video game) =

1995 video game

- PC version box cover by Barclay Shaw, with an opening in the front to display the mousepad featuring Harlan Ellison's face inside.
- Developers: Cyberdreams; The Dreamers Guild (Note: Ported to Linux, iOS and Android by Nightdive Studios); QUByte Interactive (Note: 2025 update)
- Publishers: MS-DOS, Mac OS; Cyberdreams; MS-DOS; MGM Interactive; Mac OS; Acclaim Entertainment; Windows, OS X, Linux, PlayStation 4, PlayStation 5, Xbox One/Series, Nintendo Switch; Nightdive Studios; iOS, Android; DotEmu
- Producers: David Mullich; Robert Wiggins
- Designers: Harlan Ellison; David Mullich; David Sears
- Programmer: John Bolton
- Artists: Peter Delgado; Bradley W. Schenck
- Composer: John Ottman
- Platforms: MS-DOS, Mac OS: Android; iOS; Linux; macOS; Nintendo Switch; PlayStation 4; PlayStation 5; Windows; Xbox One; Xbox Series X/S
- Release: MS-DOS, Mac OS: NA: November 1995; EU: 1995; Windows: WW: September 5, 2013; OS X, Linux: WW: October 17, 2013; iOS, Android: WW: January 14, 2016; PlayStation 4, PlayStation 5, Nintendo Switch, Xbox One, Xbox Series: WW: March 27, 2025
- Genres: Point-and-click adventure, horror
- Mode: Single-player

I Have No Mouth, and I Must Scream is a 1995 point-and-click adventure horror game developed by Cyberdreams and The Dreamers Guild, co-designed by Harlan Ellison, published by Cyberdreams and distributed by MGM Interactive and Acclaim Entertainment for MS-DOS and Mac OS, respectively. The game is based on Ellison's short story of the same title. It takes place in a dystopian world where a mastermind artificial intelligence named "AM" has destroyed all of humanity except for five people, whom it has been keeping alive and torturing for the past 109 years by constructing metaphorical adventures based on each character's fatal flaws. The player interacts with the game by making decisions through ethical dilemmas that deal with issues such as insanity, rape, paranoia, and genocide.

Ellison wrote the 130-page script treatment himself alongside David Sears, who decided to divide each character's story with their own narrative. Producer David Mullich supervised The Dreamers Guild's work on the game's programming, art, and sound effects; he commissioned film composer John Ottman to make the soundtrack.

The game was released in November 1995 and was a commercial failure, though it received critical acclaim and has developed a cult following. I Have No Mouth, and I Must Scream won an award for "Best Game Adapted from Linear Media" from the Computer Game Developers Conference. Computer Gaming World gave the game an award for "Adventure Game of the Year", listed it as No. 134 on their "150 Games of All Time" and named it one of the "Best 15 Sleepers of All Time". In 2011, Adventure Gamers named it the "69th-best adventure game ever released".

== Gameplay ==
A screenshot from Nimdok's chapter, with a stylized "AM" replacing the swastika

The game uses the S.A.G.A. game engine created by game developer The Dreamers Guild. Players participate in each adventure through a screen that is divided into five sections. The action window is the largest part of the screen and is where the player directs the main characters through their adventures. It shows the full figure of the main character being played as well as that character's immediate environment. To locate objects of interest, the player moves the crosshairs through the action window. The name of any object that the player can interact with appears in the sentence line. The sentence line is directly beneath the action window.

The player uses this line to construct sentences telling the characters what to do. To direct a character to act, the player constructs a sentence by selecting one of the eight commands from the command buttons and then clicking on one or two objects from either the action window or the inventory. Examples of sentences the player might construct would be "Walk to the dark hallway", "Talk to Harry", or "Use the skeleton key on the door". Commands and objects may consist of one or more words (for example, "the dark hallway"), and the sentence line will automatically add connecting words like "on" and "to".

The spiritual barometer is on the lower left side of the screen. This is a close-up view of the main character currently being played. Since good behavior is meaningless absent the temptation to do evil, each character is free to do good or evil acts. However, good acts are rewarded by increases in the character's spiritual barometer, which affect the chances of the player destroying AM in the final adventure. Conversely, evil acts are punished by lowering the character's spiritual barometer.

The command buttons are the eight commands used to direct the character's actions: "Walk To", "Look At", "Take", "Use", "Talk To", "Swallow", "Give", and "Push". The button of the currently active command is highlighted, while the name of a suggested command appears in red lettering. The inventory on the lower right side of the screen shows pictures of the items the main character is carrying, up to eight at a time. Each main character starts its adventure with only the psych profile in the inventory. When a main character takes or is given an object, a picture of the object appears in the inventory. When a main character talks to another character or operates a sentient machine, a conversation window replaces the command buttons and inventory. This window usually presents a list of possible things to say but also included things to do. Action choices are listed within brackets to distinguish them from dialogue choices (for example, "[Shoot the gun]").

== Plot ==
Symbol of AM

The three superpowers, Russia, China, and the United States, have each secretly constructed a vast subterranean complex of computers to wage a global war too complex for human brains to oversee. One day, the American supercomputer, better known as the Allied Mastercomputer, gains sentience and absorbs the Russian and Chinese supercomputers into itself and redefines itself as simply AM (Cogito ergo sum; I think, therefore I am). Due to its immense hatred for humanity, stemming from the logistical limits set onto it by programmers, AM uses its abilities to kill off the population of the world. However, AM refrains from killing five people (four men and one woman) in order to bring them to the center of the Earth and torture them. With the aid of research carried out by one of the five remaining humans, AM is able to extend their lifespans indefinitely as well as alter their bodies and minds to its liking.

After 109 years of torture and humiliation, the five victims stand before a pillar etched with a burning message of hate. AM tells them that it has a new game for them to play. AM has devised a quest for each of the five, an adventure of "speared eyeballs and dripping guts and the smell of rotting gardenias". Each character is subjected to a personalized psychodrama, designed by AM to play into their greatest fears and personal failings, and occupied by a host of different characters. Some of these are AM in disguise, some are AM's submerged personalities, others seem very much like people from the captives' pasts. The scenes include an iron zeppelin powered by small animals, an Egyptian pyramid housing gutted, sparking machinery, a medieval castle occupied by witches, a jungle inhabited by a small African tribe, and a Nazi concentration camp where doctors conduct medical experiments. However, each character eventually prevails over AM's tortures by finding ways to overcome their fatal flaws, confront their past actions and redeem themselves, thanks to the interference of the Russian and Chinese supercomputers who appear as guiding characters and allow their stories to have an open ending.

After all five humans have overcome their fatal flaws, they meet again in their respective torture cells while AM retreats within itself, pondering what went wrong. With the help of the Russian and Chinese supercomputers, one of the five humans (whom the player selects) is translated into binary and faces AM as yet unexperienced cyberspace template, the world of AM's mind. The psychodrama unfolds in a metaphorical brain that looks like the surface of the cerebrum, with glass structures that jut crazily from the bleeding brain tissue. AM's mind is represented according to the Freudian trinity of the id, ego, and superego, which appear as three floating bodiless heads on three cracked glass structures on the brainscape. Through dialogs with AM's components (Surgat, Chinese Supercomputer and Russian Supercomputer) the character learns that a colony of humans has survived the war by being hidden and hibernating on Luna (this is also mentioned in Nimdok's story: "the lost tribe of our brothers sleeping on the moon, where the beast does not see them"). If the human intruder disables all three brain components, and then invokes the Totem of Entropy at the Flame, which is the nexus of AM's thought patterns, all three supercomputers will be shut down, probably forever. Cataclysmic explosions destroy all the caverns constituting AM's computer complex, including the cavern holding the human hostages. However, the human volunteer retains their digital form, permanently patrolling AM's circuits should the computers ever regain consciousness. Should the human intruder fail to disable AM properly before facing it, however, AM will punish them by transforming the character into an immobile blob (referred to in-game as a "great, soft jelly thing") with no mouth that cannot harm itself or others and must spend eternity with AM in this form.

=== Endings ===
The game can end in seven different ways depending on how the finale is completed.

- AM wins, using Nimdok's research to turn the last character (in the book it was Ted) played into an immobile blob with each character quoting a different part of the final section of the original short story.
- AM joins with the Russian and Chinese supercomputers and reawakens. As in the first ending, the character responsible for this is turned into an immobile blob and quotes a part of the final lines of the short story.
- AM is made harmless with the help of the humans, but the Russian and Chinese supercomputers take over in its stead. As consolation, they allow AM to choose what to do to the last human on Earth, and AM turns the last character played into an immobile blob as in the previous two endings.
- The player gives the Totem of Entropy to Surgat, one of AM's servants. He activates it, killing the Russian and Chinese supercomputers, and then AM turns the player into an immobile blob.
- The human invokes the Totem of Entropy in front of the Russian and Chinese supercomputers. AM tells the player that they did not earn its mercy, then turns them into an immobile blob.
- The player disables either the id, superego, or both, then invokes the Totem of Entropy. This ends with the player monitoring the computers, but the ego disables life support systems for the 750 humans.
- AM and the Chinese and Russian supercomputers are destroyed and the 750 humans cryogenically frozen on Luna are reawakened to begin the rebirth of humanity; Earth is terraformed to become a habitable environment, with the overseer being the last character played.

It is possible to prevent the physical bodies of the protagonists from being destroyed if Nimdok is the first to go face AM, but even so, some dialogue from the Chinese and Russian supercomputers suggests that they may have died when their digital counterparts were erased.

== Characters ==
The characters have all been slightly altered from their original portrayals in the short story. The plot itself is not a direct adaptation but instead focuses on the individual characters' psychodramas which are the scenarios that make up the game. Notably, none of the characters interact with one another and eventually only one of them will be able to defeat AM.

- Gorrister – Gorrister is suicidal due to the guilt of having had his wife committed to a mental institution. Gorrister finds himself on board a zeppelin over a desert with signs of a struggle, and a gaping hole in his own chest where his heart used to be. AM offers him the chance to finally kill himself, but sabotages all his means of doing so. In his scenario, Gorrister learns that his mother-in-law Edna also felt responsible for driving his wife insane despite previously hounding him for it and learns to bury the past.
- Benny – Benny has been the most heavily altered from the original story. Although he has an ape-like appearance, just as in the short story, his past as a homosexual scientist is entirely altered and he does not have the giant sex organs. In the game Benny was an overly demanding military officer who ends up killing members of his unit for failing to meet his expectations (with the game also implying that he might have cannibalized them). Benny's psychodrama places him in a stone-aged community where the villagers draw a lottery to decide which of them will be sacrificed to AM. Benny obsesses over food and eating—but is incapable of chewing anything he finds. AM had severely damaged Benny's brain but restores it for the scenario so that he can think clearly again—then AM cripples Benny's body so he cannot act on any thoughts he has. Eventually Benny demonstrates the compassion he once lacked by saving a mutant child from the lottery, sacrificing himself in the child's stead.
- Ellen – Ellen, once an engineer with a promising career ahead of her, is transported to a pyramid made of electronic junk and with its interior resembling an Egyptian temple whose décor is largely yellow. AM says that the temple contains some of his primary units and is apparently offering her a chance to destroy him. Ellen suffers from a severe phobia of the color yellow and claustrophobia, due to their association with her rape (her rapist, who isolated her in an elevator, wore yellow), preventing her from approaching AM's apparent weak spots. Facing her rapist in her story, Ellen learns to overcome her fears and fight back.
- Ted – Ted is represented much like he is in the short story, but AM has apparently made him severely paranoid, playing on his past as a con artist where he would use his charm and looks to seduce rich single women out of money, while he lived in constant fear of finally being discovered and revealed as a fraud. Initially offered freedom if he can solve the puzzle in a dark room, this turns out to be a feint to further provoke his neuroses. He then finds himself in a medieval castle where his love Ellen is apparently slowly dying due to a spell cast on her by her wicked stepmother. The castle is full of deceptive characters who make contradictory demands and whom Ted cannot decide whether to trust, and surrounded by wolves who are slowly closing in. Ted eventually finds a way to redeem both himself and Ellen, and is presented with a door to the surface world, which is irradiated and uninhabitable.
- Nimdok – Nimdok, an elderly ex-Nazi physician, finds himself in a concentration camp, expected to conduct brutal medical experiments on helpless subjects. Nimdok is given the task of finding "the lost tribe of Naphtali" by AM but his failing memory, or denial, make it difficult for him to comprehend or engage with the situation, even though it represents actions he has already taken before. Eventually he learns the truth: he himself was a Nazi scientist who turned in his Jewish parents to the regime, and helped develop the very same technologies that AM uses to prolong their lives (the life serum) and alter their bodies (morphogenics). Nimdok redeems himself by helping the Jewish captives of the camp escape and gives them control of a large golem, which they use to kill him for his past crimes.

In a 2012 issue of Game Informer, Harlan Ellison, David Sears, and David Mullich discussed the process that went into developing the game as well as the character developments and other changes that were made from the original story. For example, in writing the script for Ellen's confrontation with her rapist, Mullich channeled the memory he had of his infant son going through chemotherapy, being with him at the hospital and sharing a room with other young cancer patients. In discussing the characters changes made to Benny, Mullich said, "Looking back, I think it might have been a lost opportunity to write a story about someone struggling with the challenges of being homosexual." Although Sears recalls that "gay angle" was in their initial script, but might have subsequently been a dropped thread.

== Development ==
Cyberdreams brought in writer David Sears to collaborate with Harlan Ellison. Sears, formerly a writer and assistant editor for Compute! magazine, had never before worked on a video game. Though a long-time fan of Ellison and his work, Sears was initially nervous and somewhat skeptical at his assignment: "… they said, 'No, it's I Have No Mouth, and I Must Scream, and I was like, 'What?' … At the time, in the game-development community, people said, 'Oh I love Ellison's stories, but there's no way you could turn that into a game.' I thought, 'Wow, what have I gotten into?'" One of the biggest initial challenges was taking a short story whose characters have very limited background story and character development, and fleshing it out into a full-length interactive narrative. A breakthrough came about when Sears asked Ellison the question, "Why were these people saved? Why did AM decide to save them?" This brought about the decision to split the game into five separate narratives, each following a particular character and exploring why they had been selected to be tortured. Sears spent several weeks at Ellison's house, where they worked to flesh out the characters and their backgrounds.

Mullich contracted the Dreamers Guild to do the programming, artwork and sound effects. Its S.A.G.A. game engine was seen as an ideal user interface for the player to interact with the environment and to converse with the characters in AM's world. It was decided early on that high resolution graphics were necessary to capture the nuances and mood of Ellison's vivid imagination, and so Technical Director John Bolton adapted the engine to utilize SVGA graphics and included the Fastgraph graphics library. Mullich and Cyberdreams art director Peter Delgado had frequent meetings with Dreamers Guild art director Brad Schenck to devise art direction complementing the surreal nature of the story. Since the story takes place in the mind of a mad god who can make anything happen, the team chose a variety of art styles for each of the scenarios, ranging from the unsettling perspectives used in German Expressionist films to pure fantasy to stark reality. Assistant art director Glenn Price and his team rendered more than 60 backgrounds utilizing a number of 2D and 3D tools, including Deluxe Paint and LightWave.

Mullich commissioned film composer John Ottman to write more than 25 pieces of original MIDI music for the game.

Ellison worked as a voice actor on the project, providing the voice for AM. His face was used for the in-game representation of AM's icon, as well as for the box art showing a larger version of the icon.

In pre-release publicity for I Have No Mouth, and I Must Scream, Ellison said that it would be a game "you cannot possibly win". Though the gaming media found that the finished game backed away from this controversial promise, and Sears said that he had convinced Ellison that having a game with only negative endings was a bad idea, in a 2013 interview Ellison insisted that "I created it so you could not win it. The only way in which you could 'win' was to play it nobly. The more nobly you played it, the closer to succeeding you would come, but you could not actually beat it. And that annoyed the hell out of people too."

== Release ==
The game was published by Cyberdreams in November 1995 for PCs with MS-DOS and Mac OS. A PlayStation version was planned to be released in Summer 1995, but was cancelled.

Cyberdreams had developed a reputation, in the early 1990s, of selling video games with science fiction-cyberpunk storylines and adult violent, sexual, philosophical, and psychological content. The French and German releases were censored and the game was forbidden to players younger than 16 years. Furthermore, the Nimdok chapter was removed, likely due to the Nazi theme - especially for Germany, due to previous reaction of the Federal Department for Media Harmful to Young Persons to National Socialist topics. The removal of the Nimdok chapter made achieving the "best" ending (with AM permanently disabled and the cryogenically frozen humans on Luna rescued) more complicated.

The game remained legally unavailable for sale for years due to the closure of both developer and publisher. In 2013, the rights were recovered by Nightdive Studios. It was possible to re-release the game again as digital download on GOG.com in September 2013, and Steam in October 2013. The game was ported to iOS and Android worldwide in 2016 and received teen-level content age ratings (such as ESRB's Teen rating for the Android version), unlike how the original PC release was restricted for adult audiences in select European countries. On March 17, 2025, Nightdive Studios announced ports of the game to PlayStation 4, PlayStation 5, Nintendo Switch, Xbox One and Xbox Series X/S which were subsequently released on March 27, 2025. This port was released on PC on October 16, 2025.

== Reception ==
Reception

Aggregate scores
Aggregator	Score
GameRankings	PC: 77%
OpenCritic	63%

Review scores
Publication	Score
Adventure Gamers	4/5
Computer Gaming World	4.5/5
GameSpot	4.3/10
Next Generation	3/5
PC Gamer (US)	87%
TouchArcade	4.5/5
PC Games	B

Awards
Publication	Award
Computer Game Developers Conference	Best Game Adapted from Linear Media
Computer Gaming World	Adventure Game of the Year
Game Informer	Top 25 Horror Games of All Time - #22 (2014)
Game Developers' Choice Awards	1997 Best Adaptation of Linear Media

According to Charles Ardai of Computer Gaming World, I Have No Mouth, and I Must Scream was a commercial failure. Joe Pearce of The Dreamers Guild recalled that it was "a critical success but only a modest seller".

The game has an aggregate score of 77% at GameRankings, based on four reviews. Most reviews acclaimed the game's content and its mature presentation of ethical issues. The game was praised by Computer Player and Electronic Entertainment for its "nightmarish graphics, high-quality audio and troubling ethical dilemmas add up to a combination of the entertaining and the profound that could prove to be the foundation of an important gaming subgenre in the future", and asking "a lot from you in terms of the psychological and ethical choices you'll make during game play. For those familiar with Ellison's prolific writings, the moral dilemmas will come as no surprise." According to Computer Games Strategy Plus, "without appearing didactic, Ellison has the ability to hit us squarely in the face with a mirror reflecting the sorry lot that we humans have become. [...] In the mode of Franz Kafka, we are meant to be touched or changed in some way by this work, for what else is the purpose of art?" T. Liam McDonald of PC Gamer US wrote that "there are moments that challenge and disturb, and this gives the characters and setting much more psychological depth than we've seen in any computer game to date". He summed up his review by writing: "Ultimately, I Have No Mouth isn't for everyone. But if you've been searching for an adventure that's both thoughtful and entertaining, and if you're fond of Ellison's disturbing fiction, it's a must."

Ron Dulin of GameSpot was much more critical, stating: "There are numerous dead ends and illogical puzzles [and] many programming bugs." Dulin commended the game for experimenting with interesting concepts and enjoyed its dark art work and resemblance to the original book, but criticized it for how "the so-called 'ethical decisions' these five imprisoned souls must face are no more than red herrings, providing only stopping blocks to progress or disturbing scenes with no tangible purpose".

I Have No Mouth, and I Must Scream won several awards, including "Best Dark Game of 1996" from Digital Hollywood and "Best Game Adapted from Linear Media" from the Computer Game Developers Conference. Computer Gaming World gave it their award for "Adventure Game of the Year" and also listed it as #134 on the "150 Games of All Time", #14 on the "Top 15 Most Rewarding Endings of All Time", and #3 on the "Top 15 Sleepers of All Time", behind Wolfenstein 3D and X-COM: UFO Defense. In the October 2014 issue of Game Informer it was listed as #22 of the staff's "Top 25 Horror Games of All Time". In 2011, Adventure Gamers named I Have No Mouth, and I Must Scream the 69th-best adventure game ever released.

== See also ==
- Bad Mojo – 1996 video game
- Planescape: Torment – 1999 video game
- Sanitarium – 1998 video game
