= Game Axe =

Video game system released by Legend Technology in 1998

- Also known as: Game Axe Color
- Manufacturer: Legend Technology Co., LTD. / Redant
- Product family: Famicom hardware clone
- Type: Handheld video game console
- Released: 1989; 37 years ago
- CPU: NMOS 6502 @ 1.8 MHz
- Display: Passive Matrix LCD screen with backlight
- Sound: pAPU (pseudo-Audio Processing Unit)
- Controller input: Digital joypad; A, B, Turbo A and Turbo B buttons
- Power: Six AA batteries or AC adapter 9VDC/500mA

The Game Axe is an unlicensed handheld version of the Famicom, made by the Taiwanese hardware manufacturer Legend Technology Co., LTD. It is a portable Famiclone that can play Famicom games, and by using the included adapter, American and European Nintendo Entertainment System games.

== History ==
Launched in 1989, The Game Axe made a comeback around 2000, being sold in Hong Kong, Taiwan, and Japan under the Redant brand.

== Design ==
The design of the Game Axe was horizontal and similar in appearance to Sega's Game Gear. It had a 3.5-inch (model FC-812) or 4-inch (models FC-816/FC-868) colour LCD screen, two controller ports at the base, an AC jack, and an RCA jack, allowing the Game Axe to be plugged to a television and essentially replace a Famicom.

=== Technical specifications ===
These are the basic technical specifications for the Game Axe:

- Power: 9 volts DC 500-1000mA / 6 AA batteries.
- CPU: NMOS 6502 at 1.8 MHz
- Graphics: PPU (Picture Processing Unit)
- Display: 3.8 inch Passive Matrix LCD screen with backlight.
- Sound: pAPU (pseudo-Audio Processing Unit)
- Connectors:
  - DC in, cartridge slot, A/V Out, RCA A/V in (component video Y-cable connecting to 1/8” mini jack)
  - Controllers
  - A/V Out (using standard Sega Genesis A/V out cord)
  - Phones

=== Issues with the NES cartridge adapter ===
Due to the necessity of an extra adapter, the Game Axe suffers severe stability issues if playing NES games while holding the device. Any jarring of the hand held causes NES games to lose enough contact to freeze or shut off.

== See also ==
- Sega Nomad
- TurboExpress
