= TurboExpress =

1990 handheld game console by NEC

TurboExpress/PC Engine GT
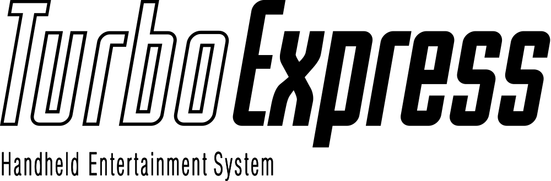

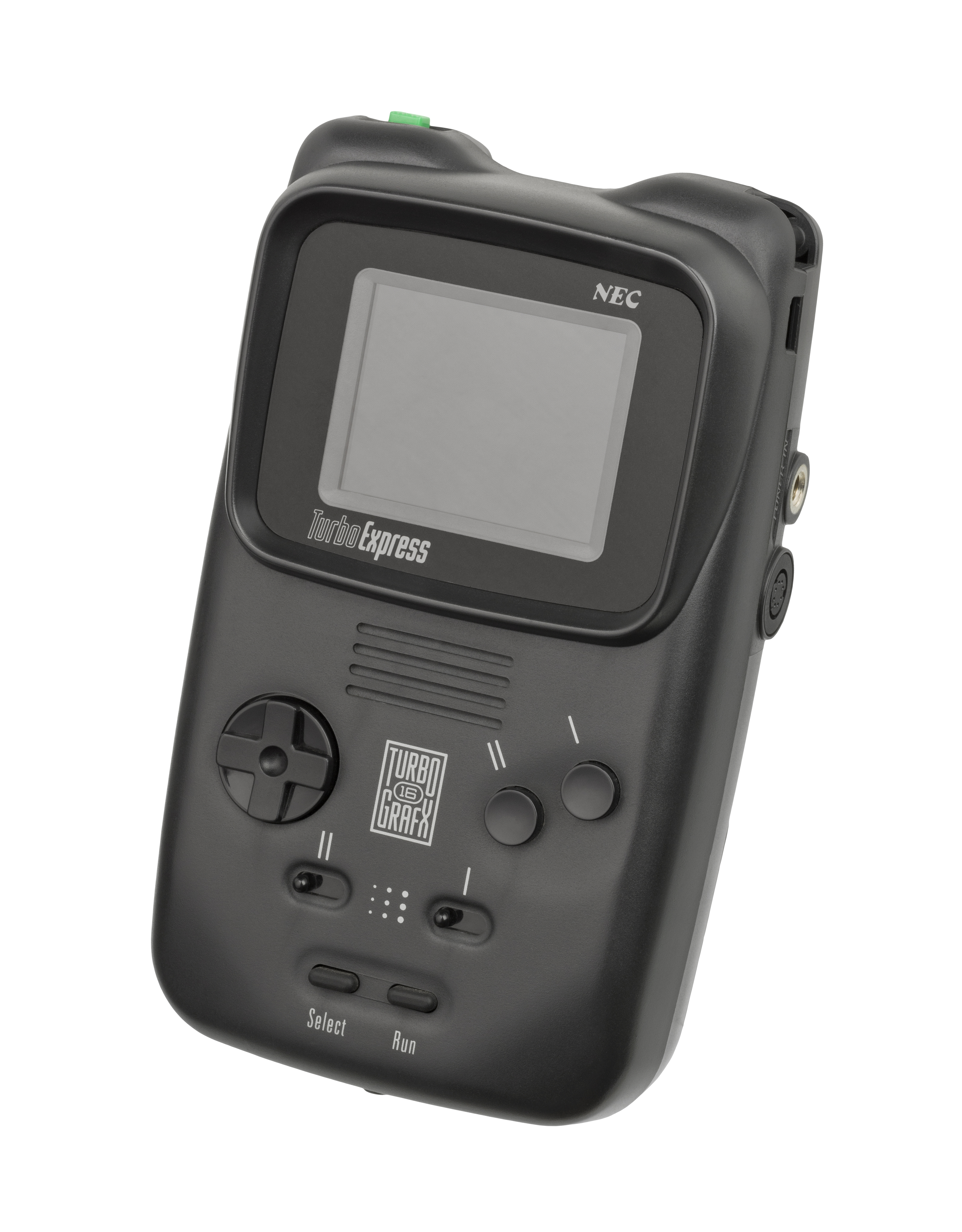
- TurboExpress handheld
- Also known as: HES-EXP-01
- Manufacturer: NEC Home Electronics
- Type: Handheld game console
- Generation: Fourth
- Released: JP: December 1, 1990; NA: December 1990
- Introductory price: $249.99, ¥44,800
- Discontinued: NA: 1994
- Units sold: 1.5 million units
- Media: HuCard
- CPU: HuC6280 @ 7.16 MHz or 1.79 MHz
- Memory: 8 KB RAM; 64 KB VRAM
- Display: 2.6 in. TFT active matrix backlit LCD, 336×221 pixels, 512 color palette, 481 colors on-screen
- Graphics: 2x HuC6270A VDC
- Sound: HuC6280, 6-channel wavetable synthesis and PCM playback, monophonic speaker, 3.5mm stereo output jack
- Connectivity: TurboLink
- Power: 6 AA batteries or 6 volt AC adapter
- Related: TurboGrafx-16

The TurboExpress is an 8-bit handheld game console by NEC Home Electronics, released in late 1990 in Japan and the United States, branded as the PC Engine GT in Japan and TurboExpress Handheld Entertainment System in the U.S. It is essentially a portable version of the TurboGrafx-16 home console that came out one to three years earlier. Its launch price in Japan was ¥44,800 and US$249.99 (equivalent to $620 in 2025) in the U.S.

The TurboExpress was technically advanced for the time, able to play all the TurboGrafx‑16's HuCard games, featuring a backlit, active-matrix color LCD screen, and optional TV tuner.

The TurboExpress primarily competed with Nintendo's Game Boy, Sega's Game Gear, and the Atari Lynx. With 1.5 million units sold, far behind its two main competitors, NEC failed to gain significant sales or market share in the handheld market.

== History ==
The TurboExpress's codename was Game Tank. A working prototype was revealed in the April 1990 issue of VG&CE. It was eventually released in December 1990 in both Japan and the U.S. Its price in the U.S. was briefly raised to $299.99 in March 1991 due to higher costs of the display, before dropping back to its launch price of $249.99, and lowering the price again to $199.99 in 1992.

Regardless of its technical advantages upon its release, the TurboExpress was not widely recognized or adopted by consumers. In addition to NEC's marketing issues, the handheld was initially released for $249.99, significantly higher than popular competitors. Because of this price tag, it was labeled as the "Rolls-Royce of handheld systems". On the other hand, the ability to run the same software as its console counterpart meant that additional portable system specific software did not have to be purchased if already owning the console, resulting in a (oftentimes substantial) cost savings.

== Hardware ==
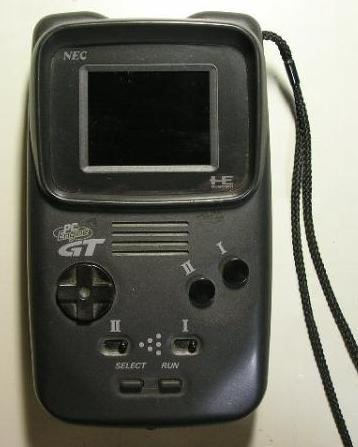
The PC Engine GT

The screen is sized 66 mm (2.6 in.), the same as the original Game Boy. It can display 64 sprites at once, 16 per scanline, in up to 481 colors from a palette of 512. It has 8 kilobytes of RAM, and it runs a HuC6280 CPU at 1.79 or 7.16 MHz, same as TurboGrafx-16.

The TurboExpress had a backlit display. Handheld market leader Nintendo did not have a backlit handheld until the release of the Game Boy Light in 1998. Its keypad layout is similar to that of the original Game Boy, with the unique addition of two "turbo switches" that engage two levels of high-speed controller button re-triggering to assist the player.

Due to a problem with faulty capacitors (an industry-wide issue in the early 1990s), sound failure is a frequent problem with the TurboExpress, sometimes even in new systems. The screen used in the TurboExpress was another source for problems, though it was state of the art when it was released. The LCD technology used was still fairly new and the rate of pixel failure was very high. Brand-new TurboExpress systems often had several bad pixels. Text is also difficult or impossible to read in certain circumstances, as many times fonts were written to be seen on a television screen, not on a small LCD screen. As a result, certain RPGs and adventure games can be difficult to play on the unit.

The TurboExpress plays the same game cartridges as the TurboGrafx-16 home console. Some TurboGrafx-16 HuCards save game data to the internal memory of the TurboGrafx-CD unit, TurboDuo, or TurboBooster Plus (a peripheral for the core TG-16 console). The TurboExpress lacks this internal memory and, as a result, is not capable of saving in this manner. Most games provide a password save mechanism as an alternative.

The battery life is about three hours for 6 AA batteries. This is also a problem for other color and backlit or sidelit handhelds of the time, such as the Game Gear at 5–6 hours, the Sega Nomad at 2–3 hours, and the Atari Lynx at more than 4 hours. Nintendo's Game Boy had a 12- to 40-hour lifespan on 4 AA batteries.

=== Specifications ===
- CPU: HuC6280
- CPU speed: 7.16 MHz or 1.79 MHz (switchable in software)
- Resolution: 400x270 pixels
- Color palette: 512 colors; 9-bit RGB
- Max simultaneous colors: 481 on screen
- Max sprites: 64
- Audio: 6-voice wavetable synthesis

=== TurboLink ===
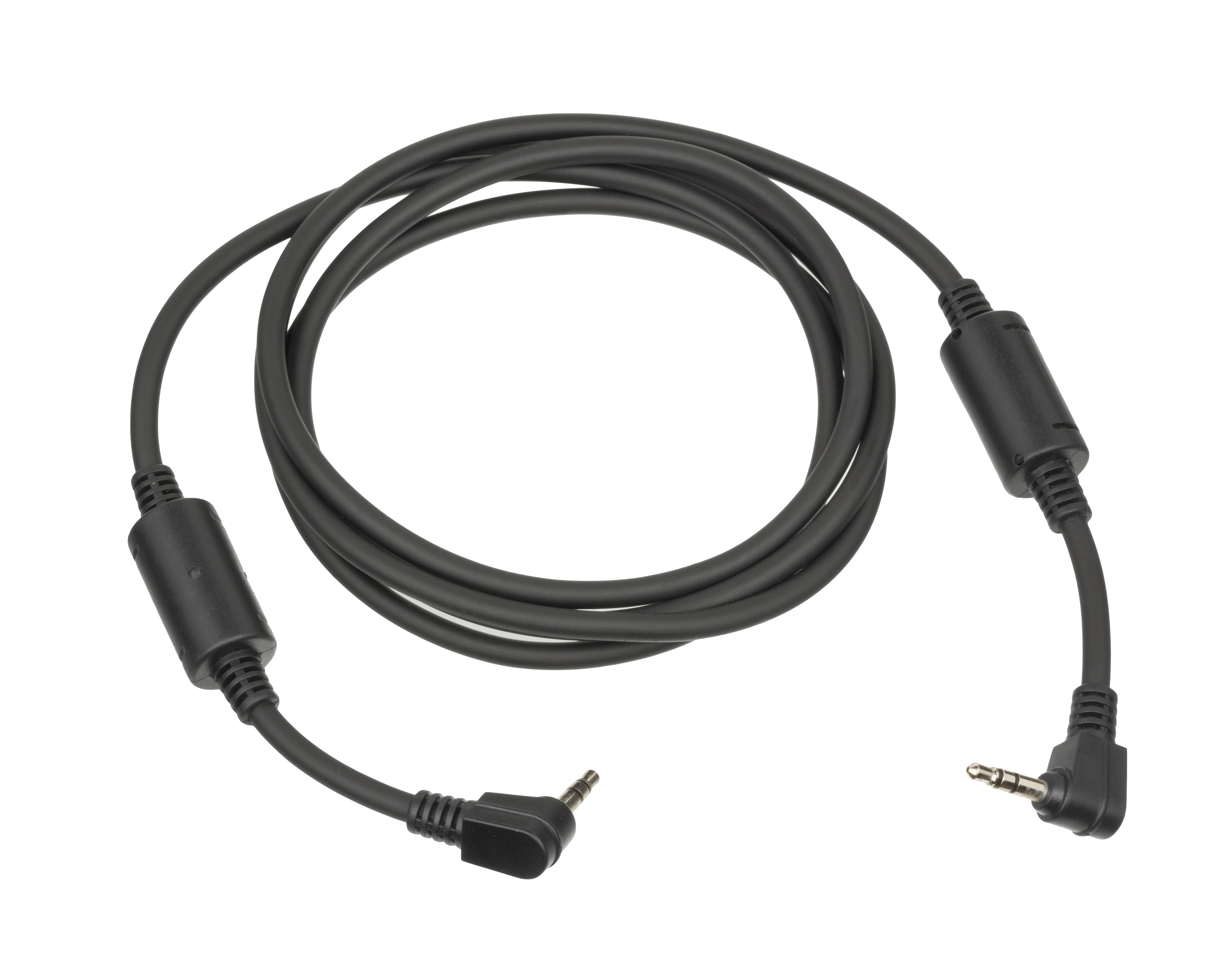
The TurboLink cable

The TurboLink allows two-player play. Falcon, a flight simulator, includes "head-to-head" dogfight and cooperative modes that can only be accessed via TurboLink. This technology was also used for Bomberman '93 Com-Link multiplayer. Although it was released after the TurboExpress launch, very few TG-16 games offer co-op play modes especially designed with the TurboExpress in mind.

=== TurboVision ===
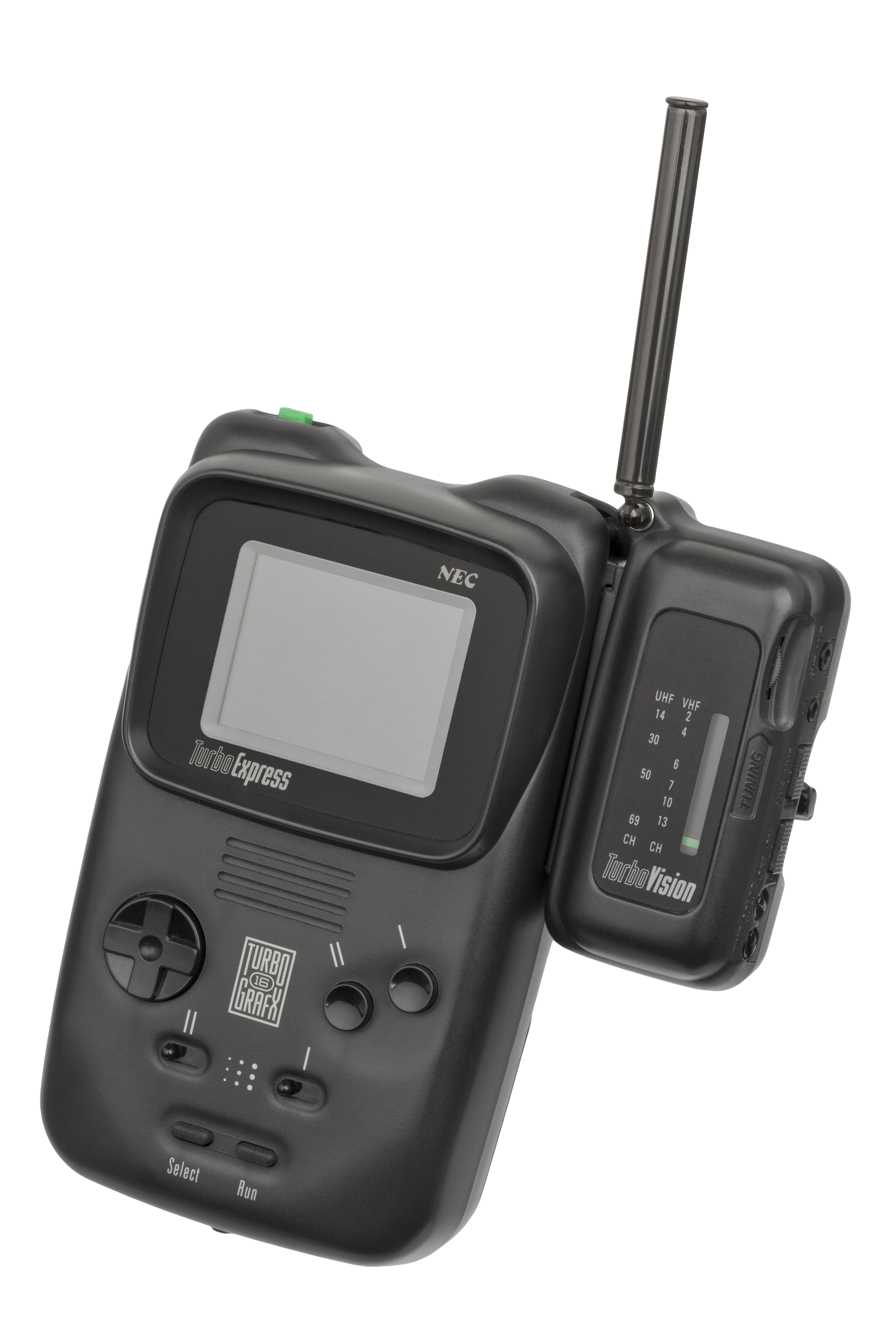
The TurboVision TV tuner

TurboVision is a TV tuner adapter for the TurboExpress converting the TurboExpress into a handheld television. The accessory was available at launch for US$100 (equivalent to $250 in 2025). It allowed a player to either watch television, or go back to playing games with the flip of a switch; in other words, one may use the TurboExpress as a video monitor. It includes an RCA audio/video input for external composite video signals. Due to the widespread adoption of digital television and the HDTV standard, however, the adapter will no longer function as a television in most places due to the lack of any HDTV digital processing circuitry (the tuner can only process an analog signal for television). Due to this limitation, the TV tuner adapter is now relegated to a collectible for most people, although its RCA audio/video input function will still be operational (albeit limited with its low screen resolution).

== Reception ==
Computer Gaming World favorably compared TurboExpress to the Game Boy, but stated that the NEC handheld "gobbles power like crazy ... almost forcing players to immediately purchase an AC adapter". The magazine nonetheless praised its compatibility with TurboGrafx games, and concluded, "to see this machine in action is to fall in love with it".

Entertainment Weekly praised the new 16 bit computer architecture of the system and the graphics of the games, but warned that the small screen is a downgrade for those used to playing the games on a big screen.

== See also ==
- TurboGrafx-16
- TurboGrafx-16 Mini, a home video game console with a TurboExpress display option.

== Other sources ==
- The Electronic Gaming Monthly 1991 Video Game Buyers Guide.
