= Hudson Soft HuC6270 =

Video display controller developed by Hudson Soft

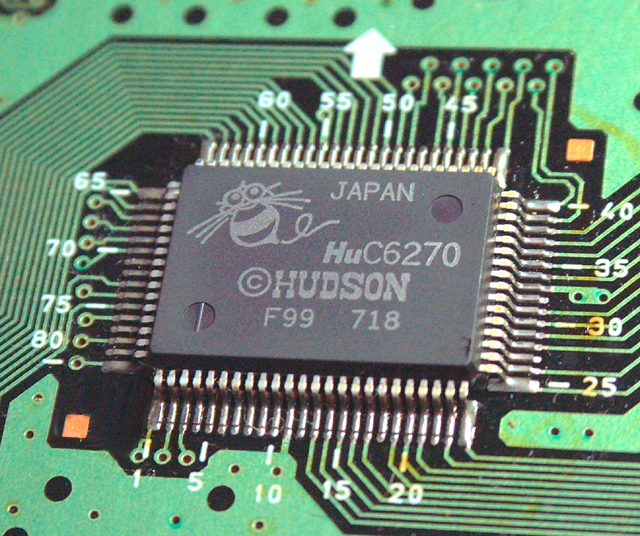
Hudson Soft HuC6270 VDC

HuC6270 is a video display controller (VDC) developed by Hudson Soft and manufactured for Hudson Soft by Seiko Epson. This VDC was used in the PC Engine game console series produced by NEC Corporation, and the upgraded PC Engine SuperGrafx.

== Technical specification ==
The HuC6270 generates a display signal composed of a 9-bit stream pixel data with a color and palette indices, and indication of whether the pixel corresponds to background (with two-dimensional scrolling) or sprites. This data can be used by a separate color encoder chip to output graphics. On the PC Engine this chip stores colour palettes for the background and sprites, with 9-bit RGB color depth.

It uses external VRAM via a 16-bit address bus. It can display up to 64 sprites on screen, with a maximum of 16 sprites per horizontal scan line.

The minimum resolution is 256 × 224 pixels, with resolutions up to 512 × 240 being possible.

== Uses ==
The HuC6270 was used in consoles of the PC Engine, SuperGrafx and TurboGrafx-16 ranges.

Additionally, the VDC was used in arcade games:

- Alien Crush
- Blazing Lazers
- Bloody Wolf
- Fishing Master
- Go! Go! Connie chan Jaka Jaka Janken
- Keith Courage In Alpha Zones
- Pac-Land
- Paranoia
- Super Medal Fighters
- TourVisión

The arcade version of Bloody Wolf ran on a custom version of the PC Engine. The arcade hardware is missing the second 16-bit graphic chip, the HuC6260 (鉄観音 - "TETSU") video color encoder, that is in the PC Engine. This means the VDC directly accesses palette RAM and builds out the display signals/timing. A rare Capcom quiz-type arcade game also ran on a modified version of the SuperGrafx hardware, which used two VDCs.
