= Bloody Wolf =

1988 video game

- Developer: Data East
- Publisher: Data East (Note: The TurboGrafx-16 port was published by NEC Technologies in North America.)
- Designer: Yoshiaki Honda
- Programmers: Takaaki Inoue; Sōichi Akiyama (Arcade & PCE); Minoru Sano (PCE)
- Artists: Shinji Noda; Masanori Tokoro; Takahide Koizumi; Mix Man; Dot Man (Arcade); Eiko Kurihara, Masahiko Ujita, Yutaka Kadode, Shinichi Kanamori, Takahide Koizumi (PCE)
- Composers: Azusa Hara; Hiroaki Yoshida; Shuji Segawa; Tatsuya Kiuchi; Hitomi Komatsu (Arcade); Shogo Sakai, Takafumi Miura, Yuji Suzuki, Yusuke Takahama (PCE)
- Platforms: Arcade, TurboGrafx-16
- Release: 1988
- Genre: Run and gun
- Modes: Single-player, multiplayer

Bloody Wolf (ならず者戦闘部隊ブラッディウルフ, Narazumono Sentō Butai Bloody Wolf; "Rogue Combat Squad: Bloody Wolf"), released in Europe as Battle Rangers, is a run and gun arcade game released by Data East in 1988. Two commandos take on an entire army with many weapons, and defeat bosses to advance levels.

== Plot ==
Snake and Eagle, two commandos of the Bloody Wolf special forces, receive instructions from their commander to destroy the enemy's weapon base and rescue any allies who have been reported missing in action, as well as the President. In the Battle Rangers version, their commander is a Secretary of State and the instructions are simply "save the top urgent crisis of our nation."

In the end, the Colonel tells Snake and Eagle that their next mission is to rescue the President once again; however, after having decided to "party it up tonight", the men decline to take the mission and abandon the Colonel.

== Gameplay ==
Player battling Green Soldiers (arcade version)

The game uses a side-view and employs a multi-directional attack method similar to many other arcade games of the run and gun genre, including Guerilla War, Ikari Warriors, Mercs and Data East's own Heavy Barrel.

Allowing up to two players to play simultaneously, once players create their own codename using up to three initials, they receive a quick mission briefing before the mission ensues. Players automatically begin the game with a machine gun containing unlimited ammo and a knife used exclusively for close quarters combat. The mission's levels are separated into "scenes" and usually consist of one or more players running through various terrain, attacking hordes of enemy soldiers, and reaching the end of the stage to battle a boss. Players have the option to rescue various hostages scattered throughout the levels to obtain new weapons or items.

== Ports ==
The game was ported to the PC Engine (known as the TurboGrafx-16 in North America) by Data East in 1989, and published a year later in the US by NEC. The PC Engine/TurboGrafx-16 version retains much of the same gameplay elements, level designs, enemies, and items as the arcade version.

Differences between the Arcade and PC Engine/TurboGrafx-16 versions

- Player names: Both versions allow the players to create their own codenames as a name entry. However, the default codenames of the two commandos in the PC Engine/TurboGrafx-16 version are Eagle and Snake, respectively.
- Numbers of players: The arcade version allows up to two players to play whereas its PC Engine/Turbografx-16 counterpart offers only a single-player mode with the option to play as either Snake or Eagle.
- Levels: The PC Engine/TurboGrafx-16 version contains one additional level, making its total to eight.
- Mission objectives: The mission briefing in the PC Engine/TurboGrafx-16 port differs slightly by attempting to provide some type of backstory and changing the scenario. The player receives information that the enemy has kidnapped the President and the mission is to rescue him.
- Dialogue: Interaction between the player and hostages generates much more dialogue in the PC Engine/TurboGrafx-16 version. There is also an added political reference in the beginning.
- Music: Though the PC Engine/TurboGrafx-16 had a more limited soundbank, the music was greatly enhanced to support full length catchy tracks. Toto's "White Sister" was redone in arcade game style and used in one of the sequences of gameplay when rescuing the fellow mercenary.
- Items: The "Rosary" from the arcade version was renamed to "Lucky Rabbit's Foot" in the TurboGrafx-16 version.
- Level design: The PC Engine/TurboGrafx-16 version contains much larger levels.

== Reception ==
The game was reviewed in 1990 in Dragon #164 by Hartley, Patricia, and Kirk Lesser in "The Role of Computers" column. They gave it 3½ out of 5 stars.
