= PC Engine SuperGrafx =

1989 home video game console

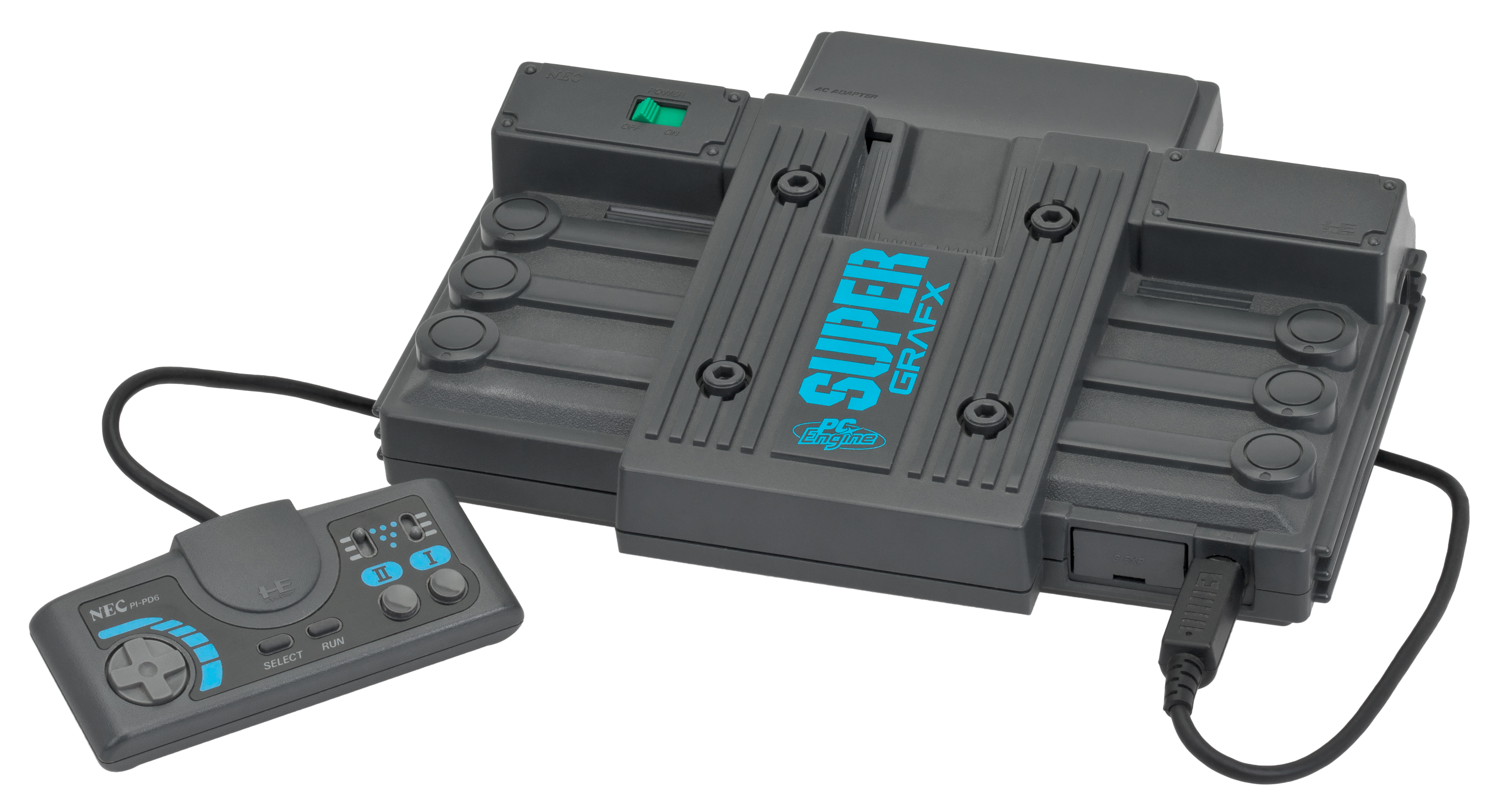
- PC Engine SuperGrafx system
- Manufacturer: NEC Home Electronics
- Type: Home video game console
- Generation: Fourth generation
- Released: JP: 8 December 1989
- Media: HuCard, CD-ROM²
- CPU: Hudson Soft HuC6280A @ 1.79 or 7.16 MHz
- Memory: 32 KB + 128 KB
- Display: 512 colors; 282 x 242, 377 x 242, 565 x 242
- Graphics: 2x HuC6270 VDC, HuC6202 VPC, HuC6260A VCE
- Sound: HuC6280A; 6 PSG channels, 5-bit depth; 6.99 kHz sample rate
- Best-selling game: Daimakaimura
- Predecessor: PC Engine (main system)
- Successor: PC Engine Duo (updated system)

The PC Engine SuperGrafx (PCエンジンスーパーグラフィックス, Pī Shī Enjin SūpāGurafikkusu), also known as simply the SuperGrafx, is a fourth-generation home video game console manufactured by NEC Home Electronics and released in Japan in 1989. It is the successor system to the PC Engine, released two years prior. Originally known as the PC Engine 2 during production stages, it has improved graphics and audio capabilities over its predecessor.

The console was rushed to market, released several months before its initial intended release date in 1990, only having modest updates to the hardware. With only six retail games released that took advantage of the console's hardware updates, the SuperGrafx was a commercial failure, selling only 75,000 units total. None of the hardware advancements it possessed were carried over to later PC Engine models, such as the Duo & the LD-ROM² PAC for the LaserActive.

== Hardware ==
Compared to the PC Engine, the SuperGrafx has four times the amount of working RAM for the main CPU. Its main upgrade is an additional video chip with its own video RAM, with a priority controller chip, which allows the output of both video chips to be combined in various ways. This gives the SuperGrafx twice as many on-screen sprites as the original PC Engine and support for two independently scrolling background layers opposed to the PC Engine's single layer.

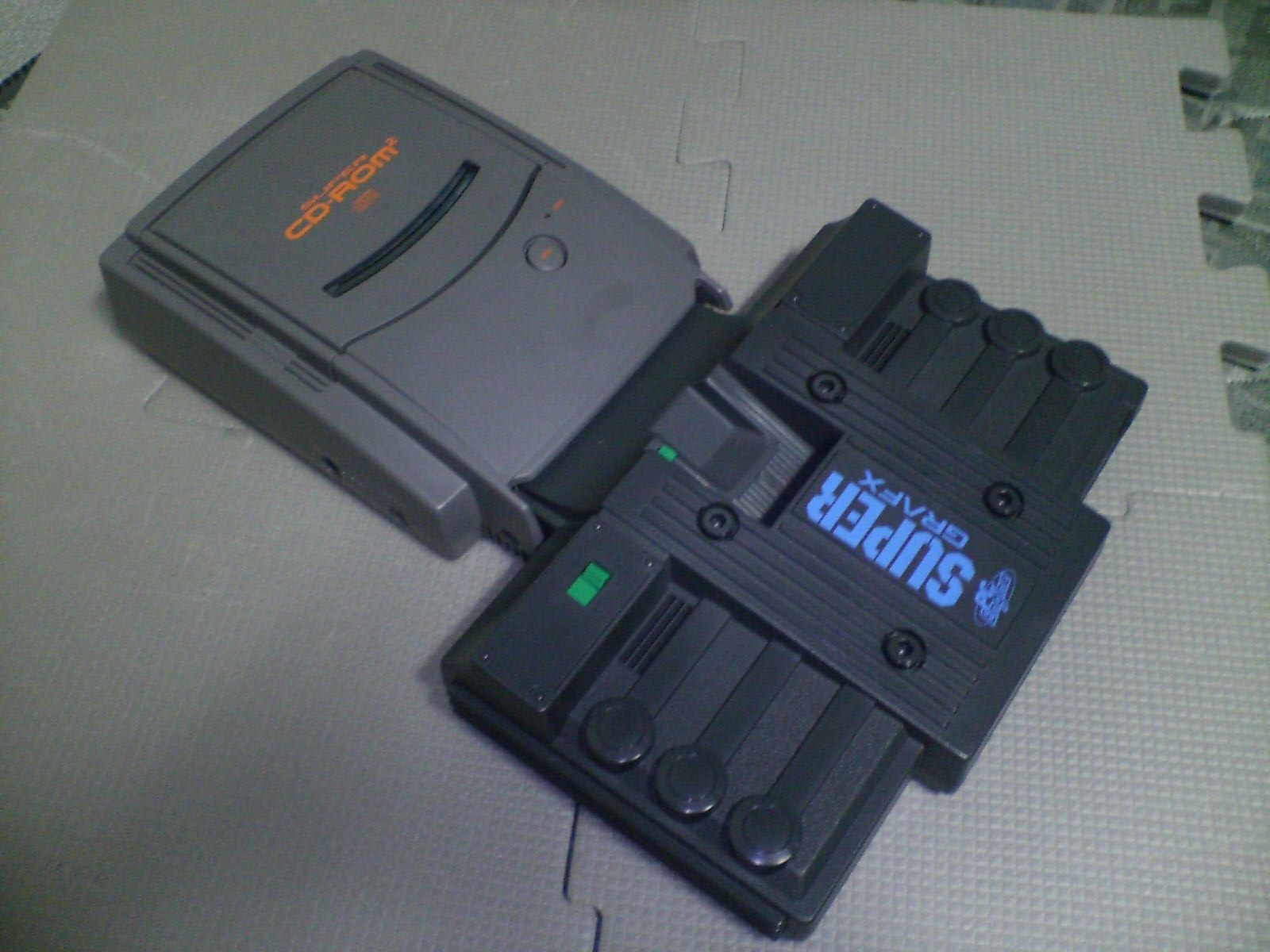
SuperGrafx with the Super CD-ROM² peripheral

Since the SuperGrafx was produced and marketed as an upgraded PC Engine model rather than as a new platform, it was backwards compatible with standard PC Engine HuCards in addition to its own. However, SuperGrafx-specific HuCards were expensive compared to standard HuCards, in some cases approaching as much as $110 USD at retail.

The SuperGrafx is also compatible with the CD-ROM² System add-on (via the ROM² Adaptor), as well as the Super CD-ROM² add-on. No CD-ROM² format games were produced that took advantage of the SuperGrafx's added capabilities.

== Technical specifications ==
=== CPU ===
The CPU is an 8-bit HuC6280A, a modified 65SC02, running at 1.79, or 7.16 MHz (switchable by software). It supports integrated bank switching hardware (driving a 21-bit external address bus from a 6502-compatible 16-bit address bus), an integrated general-purpose I/O port, a timer, block transfer instructions, and dedicated move instructions for communicating with the HuC6270A VDC.

=== Memory ===
There is 32 KB of work RAM and 128 KB (64 KB per HuC6270A VDC) Video RAM.

=== Display subsystem ===
The display subsystem is composed of two 16-bit HuC6270A Video Display Controllers (VDCs), one HuC6202 Video Priority Controller, and one HuC6260 Video Color Encoder (VCE). The HuC6270A uses port-based I/O similar to the TMS99xx VDP family.

The horizontal resolution is variable, with a maximum of 565 pixels (programmable to 282, 377 or 565 pixels, or as 5.37mhz, 7.159mhz, and 10.76mhz pixel dot clock). Taking into consideration overscan limitations of CRT televisions at the time, the horizontal resolutions were realistically limited to something a bit less than what the system was actually capable of. Most developers limited their games to either 256, 336, or 512 pixels in display width for each of the three modes. The vertical resolution is also variable, with a maximum of 242 (programmable in increments of 1 scanline).

The color depth is 9 bits, allowing 512 colors. There are 32 palettes in total: 16 for background tiles and 16 for sprites. Each sprite palette can have 15 colors defined, and has one transparent color index. Each background tile palette can have 15 colors defined, plus one color index whose color is shared across all background tile palettes.

128 sprites are simultaneously displayable with sizes of: 16×16, 16×32, 16×64, 32×16, 32×32, 32×64. Each sprite can use up to 15 unique colors (one color must be reserved as transparent) via one of the 16 available sprite palettes. The dual HuC6270A VDCs are capable of displaying 2 sprite layers (1 each). Sprites could be placed either in front of or behind background tiles. Each layer can display 16 sprites or 256 sprite pixels per scanline, giving the combined sprite per scanline limit of 32 sprites or 512 sprite pixels.

Tiles are 8 × 8 with each background tile able to use up to 16 unique colors via one of the 16 available background palettes. The first color entry of each background palette must be the same across all background palettes. The dual HuC6270A VDCs are capable of displaying 2 background layers (1 each).

=== Audio capacity ===
Six Wavetable Synthesis audio channels, programmable through the HuC6280A CPU. Each channel had a frequency of 111.87 kHz for single cycle of 32 samples (while not in D/A mode) with a bit depth of 5 bits. Each channel also was allotted 20 bytes (32×5 bits) of RAM for sample data. The waveforms were programmable so the composers were not limited to the standard selection of waveforms (square, sine, sawtooth, triangle, etc.). But the use of standard waveforms, and semi-standard forms, such as a 25% pulse wave were used fairly often. The first two audio channels (1 and 2) were capable of LFO when channel #2 was used to modulate channel #1.

Optional software enabled Direct D/A which allows for sampled sound to be streamed into any of the six PSG audio channels. When a channel is in D/A mode the frequency is as fast as the CPU can stream bytes to the port, though in practicality it is limited to 6.99 kHz when using the TIMER interrupt with its smallest loop setting (1023 cpu cycles) or 15.7 kHz using the scanline interrupt. There is a method that combines two channels in DDA mode to play back 8-bit, 9-bit, or 10-bit samples. The addition of the CD-ROM peripheral adds CD-DA sound, and a single ADPCM channel to the existing sound capabilities of the PC Engine.

=== Software media ===
The SuperGrafx is backwards compatible with all standard PC Engine HuCard-format games in addition to its own. The labels on SuperGrafx HuCards were upside-down relative to standard HuCards; A standard HuCard will read upside down on a SuperGrafx, while its own are right-side-up. The SuperGrafx is also compatible with the CD-ROM² and Super CD-ROM² System add-ons, allowing it to play any CD-ROM² format game with the required System Card. No SuperGrafx-specific CD-ROM² titles were produced.

== Peripherals ==
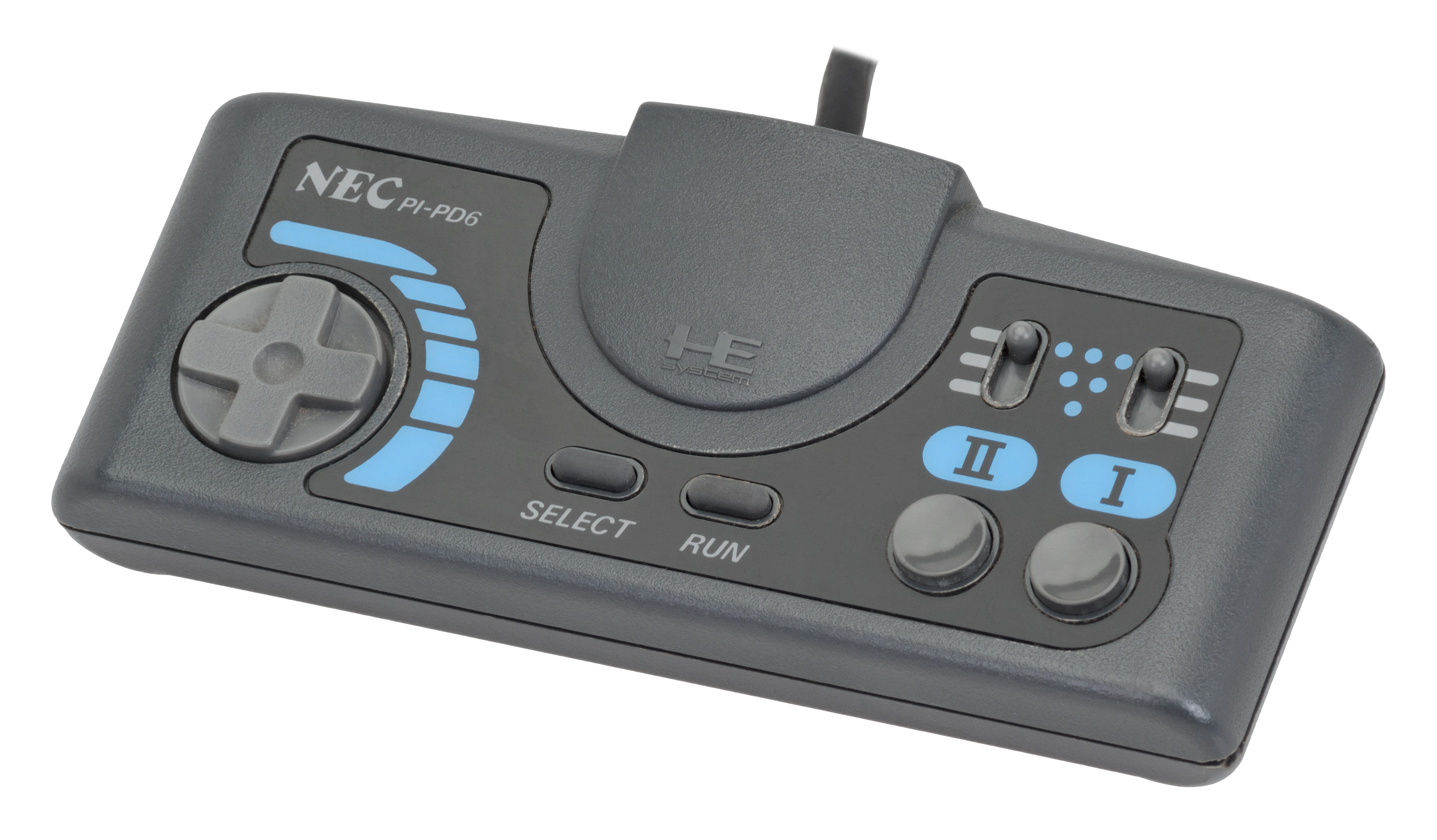
A SuperGrafx branded controller

The SuperGrafx is compatible with all standard PC Engine input devices, such as the TurboPad and the Multitap.

The ROM² Adaptor (RAU-30) was an adapter released in Japan on 20 April 1990 that allows the SuperGrafx unit to be connected into the CD-ROM² System Interface Unit. This was not required for the later Super CD-ROM² System add-on.

Power Console (PI-PD7) was an unreleased cockpit-sized controller that attaches onto the SuperGrafx unit itself, connecting via the expansion port on the front side. The peripheral would have added numerous control options such as an eight-way joystick, four action buttons, a flight yoke with two triggers (one on each handle), a throttle lever, a jog dial, three mode switches, an LCD panel, an LED indicator, four additional controller ports and a numerical keypad. The Power Console was scheduled to be released in Spring 1990 with a suggested retail price of 59,800 yen, but was never released due to its high production cost and the poor sales of the SuperGrafx itself.

== Software ==
There were only five SuperGrafx-specific HuCards produced.

- 1941: Counter Attack
- Aldynes
- Battle Ace
- Daimakaimura
- Madö King Granzört

In addition to these five games, NEC Avenue also released Darius Plus as a standard PC Engine HuCard that offered slight enhancements when played on a SuperGrafx console. As such, it was the only commercially-released HuCard game to carry the PC-SG mark. A special version of Darius Plus, titled Darius Alpha, was also released as a sweepstakes giveaway, which was limited to 800 copies that were distributed on a weekly basis from 21 September through 16 November 1990.

Many of the games that were announced for the PC Engine SuperGrafx were either canceled or repurposed into other formats. One notable example was the PC Engine port of Strider Hiryu, which was initially announced as a SuperGrafx title, but was ultimately released as an Arcade CD-ROM² disc.
