= Game Gear =

Handheld game console by Sega

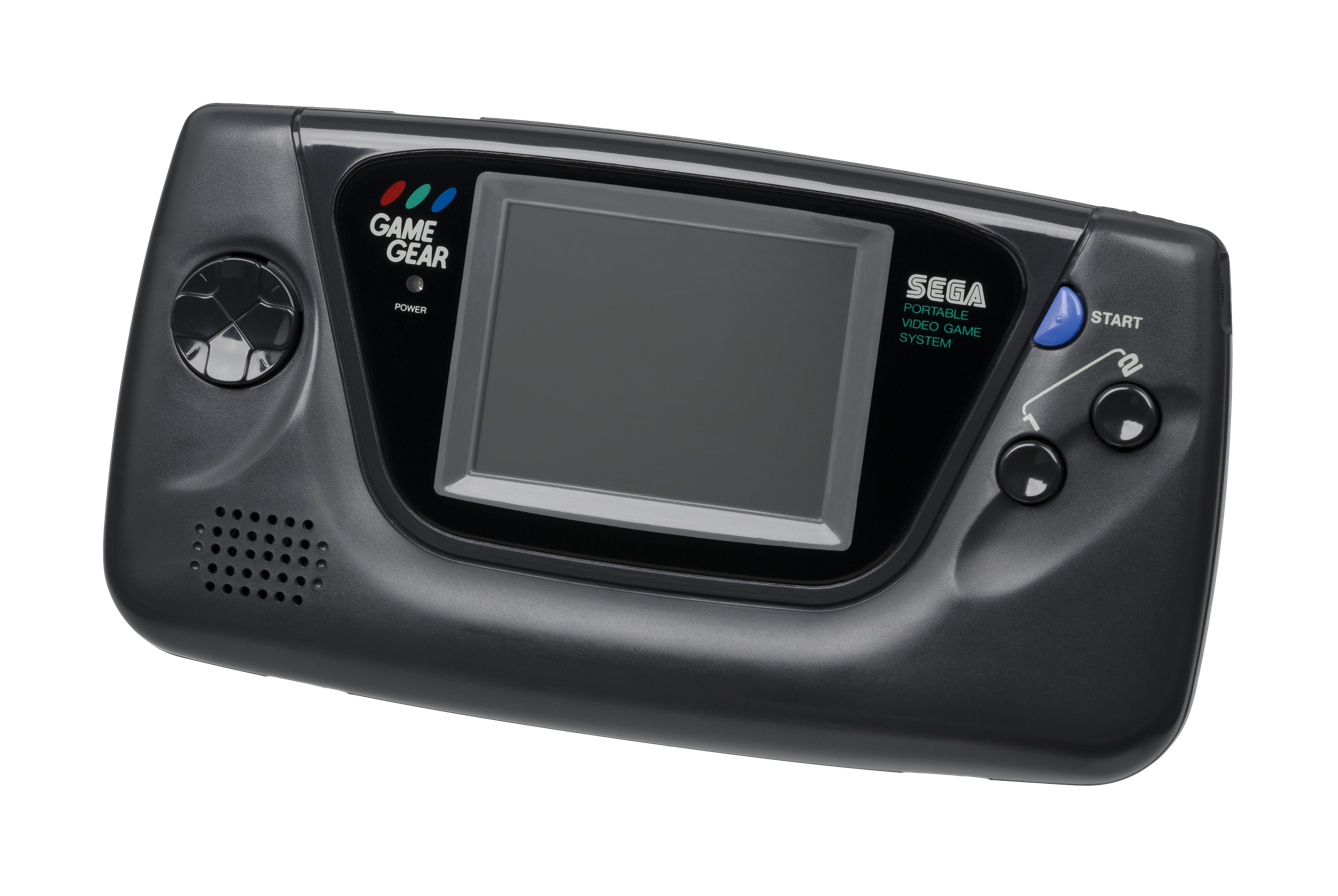
- Manufacturer: Sega
- Type: Handheld video game console
- Generation: Fourth
- Released: JP: October 6, 1990; NA/EU: April 1991; AU: 1992
- Introductory price: ¥19,800 (equivalent to ¥24,000 in 2024); US$149.99 (equivalent to $350 in 2025) £99.99 (equivalent to £230 in 2025)
- Discontinued: WW: April 30, 1997 (Sega); NA: 2002 (Majesco)
- Units sold: 14 million units
- Media: ROM cartridge
- CPU: Zilog Z80 @ 3.5 MHz
- Memory: 8 KB RAM, 16 KB VRAM
- Display: 3.2 in (81 mm) backlit LCD, 160 × 144 px
- Graphics: 4,096-color palette, 32 colors on-screen
- Sound: SN76489; Mono speaker; Headphone jack
- Power: 6 × AA batteries (3 to 5 hours)
- Dimensions: 210 × 113 × 38 mm (8.3 × 4.4 × 1.5 in)
- Best-selling game: Sonic the Hedgehog 2 (400,000)
- Successor: Genesis Nomad

The Game Gear (Note: Japanese: ゲームギア, Hepburn: Gēmu Gia) is a handheld game console developed and marketed by Sega. It was released in Japan on October 6, 1990, in North America and Europe in April 1991, and in Australia in 1992. The Game Gear was the first handheld console by Sega and competed with Game Boy from Nintendo, Lynx from Atari, and TurboExpress from NEC in the fourth generation of video game consoles.

Sega rushed the 8-bit Game Gear to market to compete with the Game Boy. It shares much of its hardware with the Master System, and can play Master System games with an adapter. Its hardware is superior to Game Boy, with a full-color backlit screen and a Z80 CPU. However, it resulted in a much shorter battery life, running for three to five hours on six AA batteries. Sega based the landscape design on the Sega Genesis controller and sought to repeat the Genesis's success by positioning the Game Gear as a more mature and attractive alternative to the Game Boy.

The Game Gear received praise for its hardware, but criticism for its short battery life, large size, and weak support from Sega. Its game library—which includes many ports of Master System games—and price point gave it an edge over the Atari Lynx and TurboExpress, but it was unable to effectively compete with the Game Boy. Sega canceled plans for a 16-bit successor and reduced Game Gear support to prioritize its home consoles. It sold approximately 14 million units. Majesco rereleased the Game Gear as a budget system between 2000 and 2002, under license from Sega.

== History ==
Developed as codename "Project Mercury", the Game Gear was launched in Japan on October 6, 1990, in North America and Europe in 1991, and in Australia in 1992. Originally retailing at ¥19,800 in Japan, US$149.99 (equivalent to $400 in 2025) in North America, and £99.99 in the United Kingdom, the Game Gear was developed to compete with the Game Boy, which Nintendo had released in 1989. The decision to make a handheld console was made by Sega's CEO Hayao Nakayama and the name was chosen by newly appointed Sega of America CEO Michael Katz. Both Sega's chairman Isao Okawa and cofounder David Rosen approved of the name. The console had been designed as a portable version of the Master System, with more powerful features than the Game Boy, including a full-color screen instead of monochromatic. According to former Sega console hardware research and development head Hideki Sato, Sega saw the Game Boy's black and white screen as "a challenge to make our own color handheld system".

To improve upon the design of its competition, Sega modeled the Game Gear with a similar shape to a Genesis controller, intending the curved surfaces and greater length to be more comfortable to hold than the Game Boy. The console's mass was carefully considered from the beginning of the development, aiming for a total mass between that of the Game Boy and the Atari Lynx, another full-color screen competing product. Game Gear can use the Master Gear adaptor to play games from the similar Master System. The original Game Gear pack-in game was Columns, which is similar to Tetris which was bundled with the Game Boy at launch.

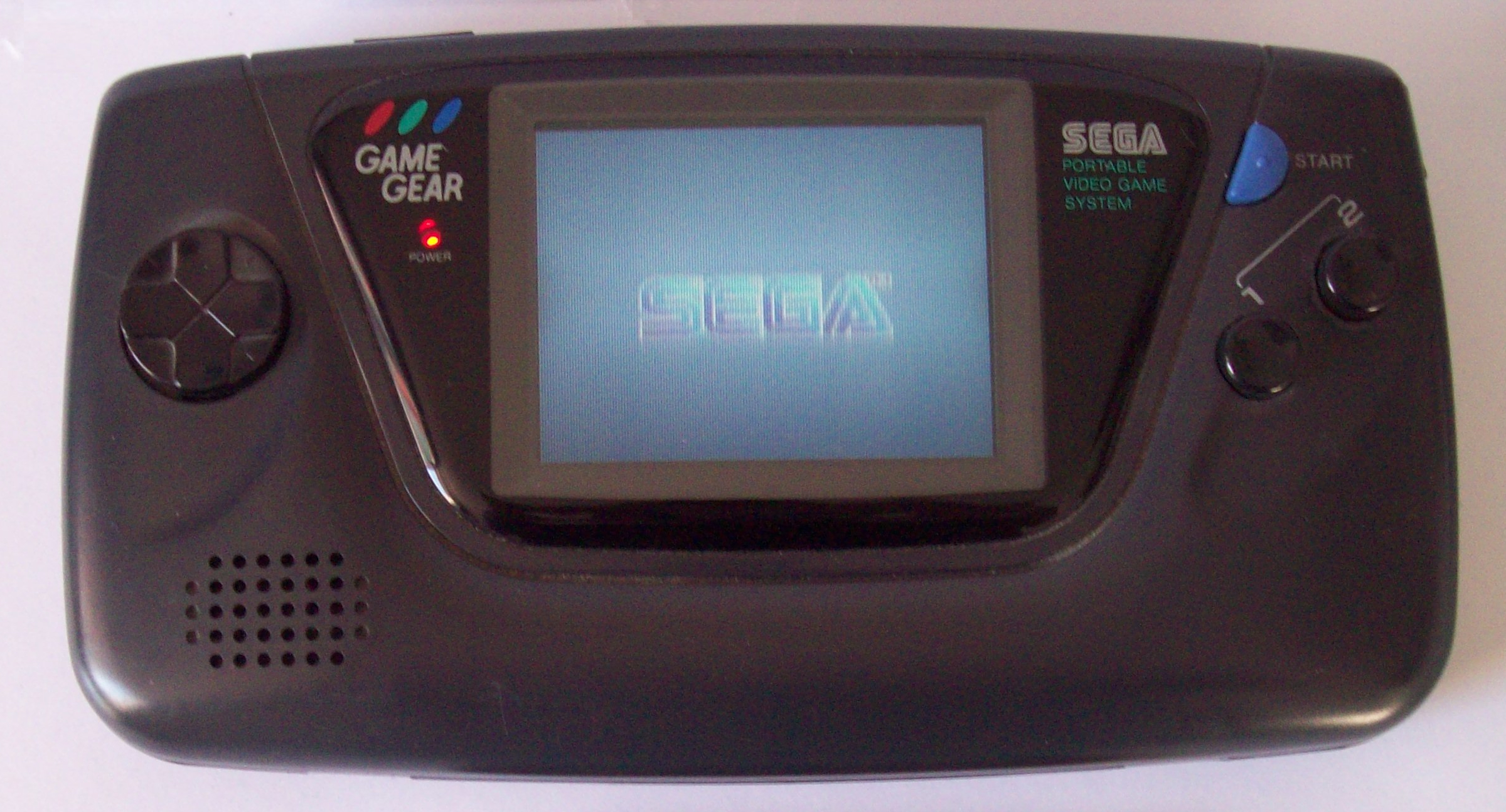
Game Gear displaying the Sega trademark in color

With a late start into the handheld console market, Sega rushed to get the Game Gear into stores quickly, having lagged behind Nintendo in sales without a handheld on the market. To simplify development, Sega based the Game Gear hardware on the Master System, with a much larger 4,096 color palette compared to the Master System's 64 colors. Part of the intention was easy conversion of Master System games. The Game Gear's stronger hardware impacted its battery life, running for three to five hours on six AA batteries, falling short of the Game Boy, which could run for more than 30 hours on four AA batteries. Its quick launch in Japan sold 40,000 units in its first two days, 90,000 within a month, and more than 600,000 back orders. According to Sega of America marketing director Robert Botch, "there is clearly a need for a quality portable system that provides features other systems have failed to deliver. This means easy-to-view, full-color graphics and exciting quality games that appeal to all ages."

=== Release and marketing ===
Before the Game Gear's launch in 1990, the 16-bit Genesis had been successfully marketed as a "more mature" option for players, and this was repeated against the Game Boy. Sega's marketing in Japan did not take this approach, instead opting for advertisements with Japanese women featuring the handheld, but Sega's worldwide advertising prominently positioned the Game Gear as the "cooler" alternative to the Game Boy.

In North America, marketing for the Game Gear included side-by-side comparisons against the Game Boy which likened Game Boy players to the obese and uneducated. Most of these advertisements feature the "Sega Scream" with a person yelling the name. One Sega advertisement in early 1994, which contained a dog looking between the two consoles, features the quote, "If you were color blind and had an IQ of less than 12, then you wouldn't mind which portable you had." Such advertising drew criticism from Nintendo, who sought to have protests organized against Sega for insulting disabled people. Sega of America president Tom Kalinske responded that Nintendo "should spend more time improving their products and marketing rather than working on behind-the-scenes coercive activities". Ultimately, this debate would have little impact on sales for the Game Gear.

Europe and Australia were the last regions to receive the Game Gear. Due to delays, some importers paid up to £200 per system. Upon launch in Europe, video game distributor Virgin Mastertronic unveiled the price as £99.99, positioning it as being more expensive than the Game Boy, but less expensive than the also full-color Atari Lynx. Marketing in the United Kingdom included the slogan, "To be this good takes Sega", and advertisements with a biker. In the United Kingdom, the Game Gear had a 16% share of the handheld market in January 1992, increasing to 40% by December 1992.

=== Decline ===
Sega reduced support for the Game Gear in favor of home consoles. The successful Genesis yielded two major peripherals, the Sega CD and the 32X. The 32-bit Saturn console was launched in 1994. Though selling 10.62 million units by March 1996 (including 1.78 million in Japan), the Game Gear was never able to match the success of its main rival, the Game Boy, with ten times the sales. Sales of the Game Gear were further hurt by Nintendo's release of the smaller Game Boy Pocket, running on two AAA batteries.

Plans for a 16-bit fifth generation direct successor to the Game Gear were canceled, leaving only the Genesis Nomad, a portable version of the Genesis. Moreover, the Nomad was intended to supplement the Game Gear rather than replace it; in press coverage leading up to the Nomad's release, Sega representatives said the company was not discontinuing the Game Gear in favor of the Nomad, and that "we believe the two can co-exist". Though the Nomad had been released in 1995, Sega did not officially end support for the Game Gear until 1996 in Japan, and 1997 worldwide.

Though the system was originally discontinued in 1997, third-party publisher Majesco released a version of the Game Gear at US$30 (equivalent to $60 in 2025), with $15 games in 2000 under license from Sega. New games were released, such as a port of Super Battletank. This machine is compatible with all previous Game Gear games, but incompatible with the TV Tuner and some Master System adaptors. The system and its re-released games were sold throughout 2000 and 2001 but were discontinued the following year. Over ten years later, on March 2, 2011, Nintendo announced that its 3DS Virtual Console service on the Nintendo eShop would feature Game Gear games.

== Technical specifications ==
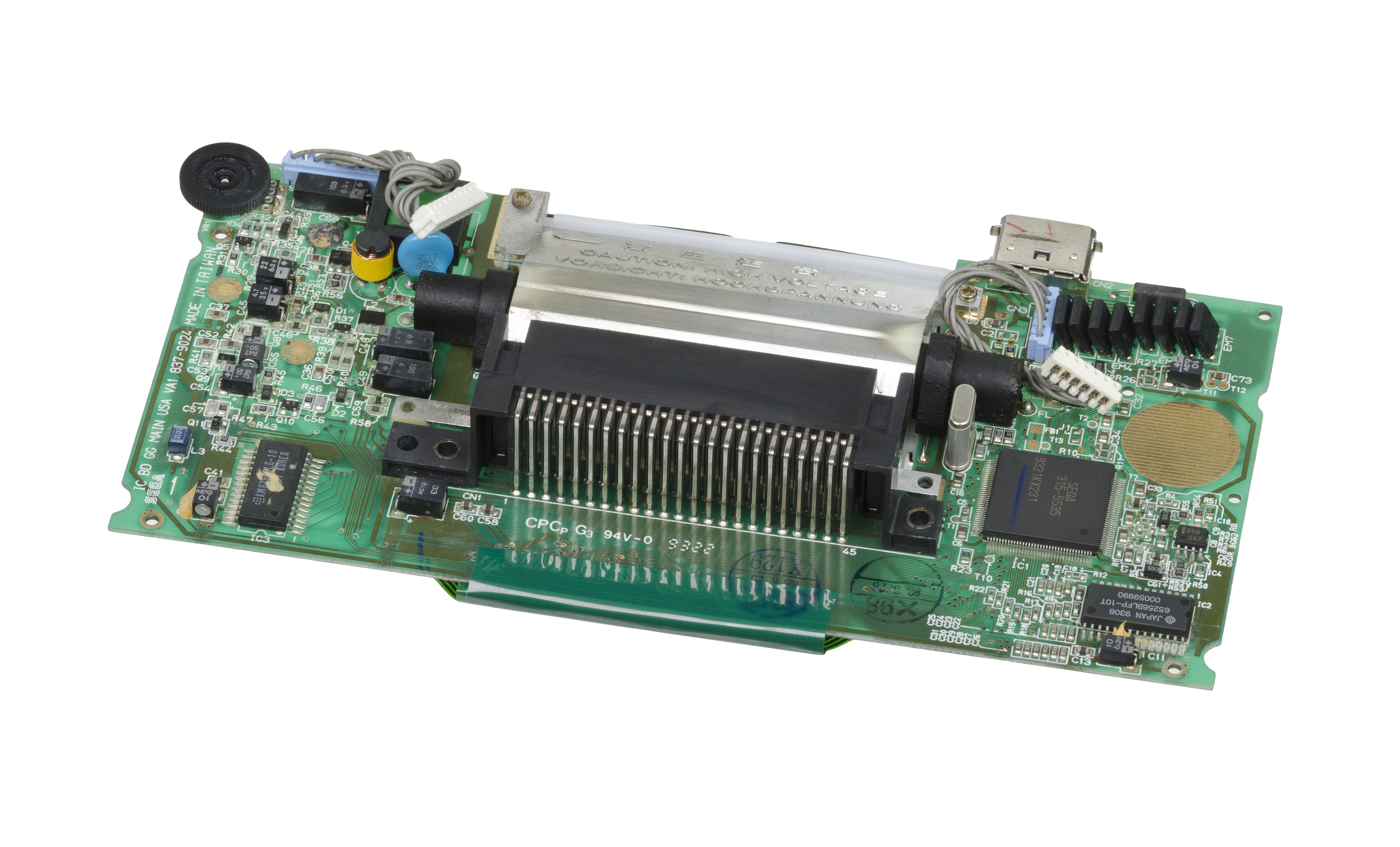
Game Gear motherboard

Much of the Game Gear's internal hardware is derived from the Master System, as the handheld was designed to be compatible with that system's library of games. It shares the same Zilog Z80 CPU, an 8-bit processor clocked at 3.5 MHz, and the Texas Instruments SN76489 sound chip, a programmable sound generator. The chip generated stereo sound, audible using headphones as the device only included a single monaural speaker. The system also contains 8 KB of RAM and 16 KB of video RAM.

The Game Gear measures 210 millimeters (8.3 in) wide, 113 mm (4.4 in) high, 38 mm (1.5 in) deep, and was designed to be played horizontally. At the center of the device is a color liquid-crystal display that measures 3.2 inches (81 mm) diagonally and is able to display up to 32 simultaneous colors from a total palette of 4,096, with a frame rate of about 60 Hz (Note: The exact frame rate was 59.922751013551 Hz) with 160 × 144 non-square pixels. The screen is backlit for low light using a small cold cathode fluorescent lamp tube.

The Game Gear is powered by six AA batteries which provide an approximate battery life of 3 to 5 hours. This was a source of significant criticism from reviewers. In response, Sega released two types of external rechargeable battery packs, intended to lengthen play time and reduce consumer cost.

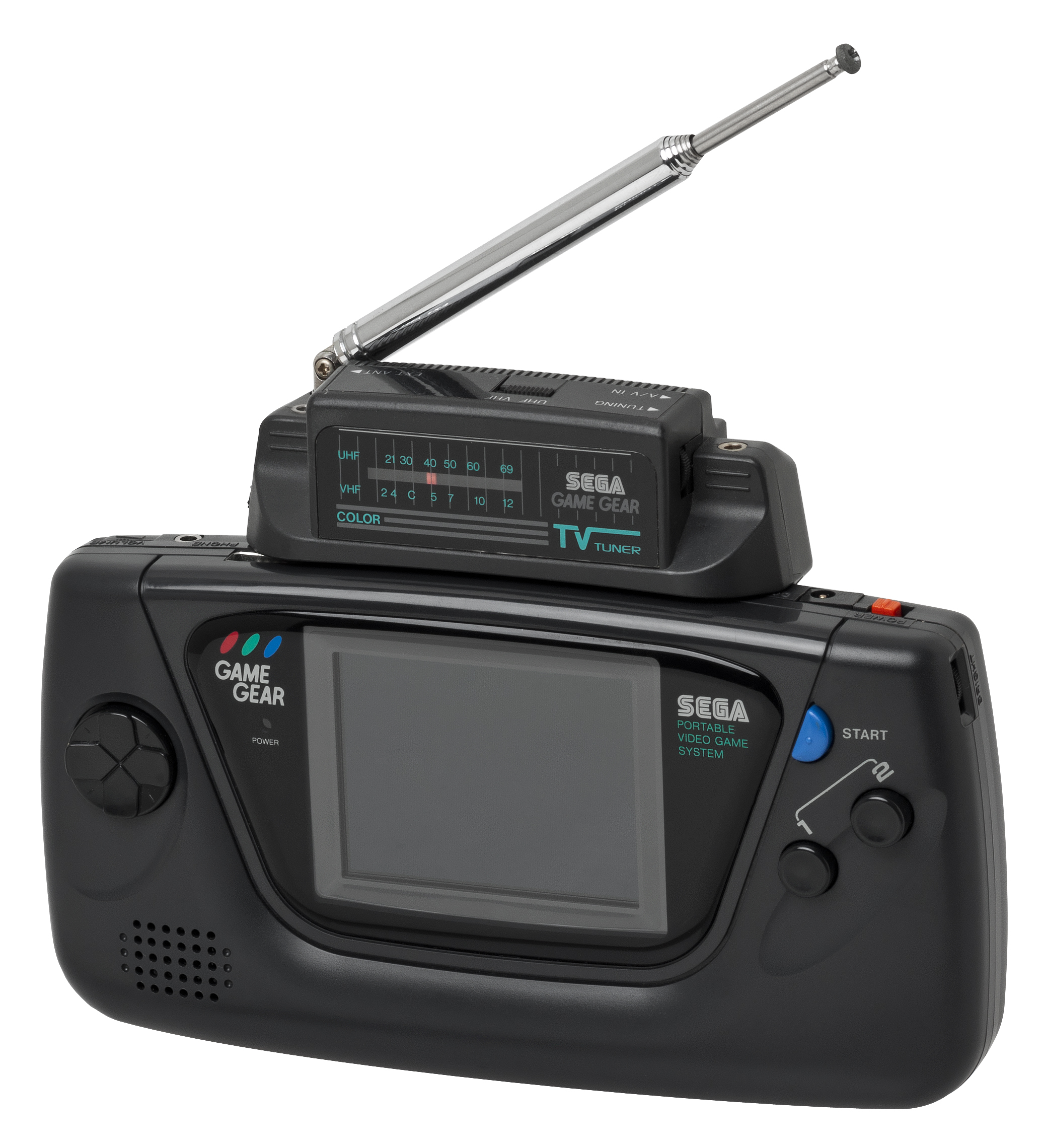
A Game Gear with TV Tuner

Available accessories included a TV Tuner with a whip antenna for the cartridge slot, to become a handheld television. Released at £74.99 (equivalent to US$130), the add-on was expensive but unique for collectors and contributed to the system's popularity. The Super Wide Gear magnifies the screen. The Car Gear adapter plugs into cigarette lighters to power the system while traveling, and the Gear to Gear Cable (VS Cable in Japan) establishes a data connection between two Game Gear systems using the same multiplayer game. Master Gear enables the Game Gear to play Master System games.

Game Gear model variations include several colors, including a blue "sports" variation in North America bundled with World Series Baseball '95 or The Lion King. A white version was bundled with a TV tuner. Other versions include a red Coca-Cola theme bundled with Coca-Cola Kid, and the Kids Gear Japan-only variation for children.

== Game library ==
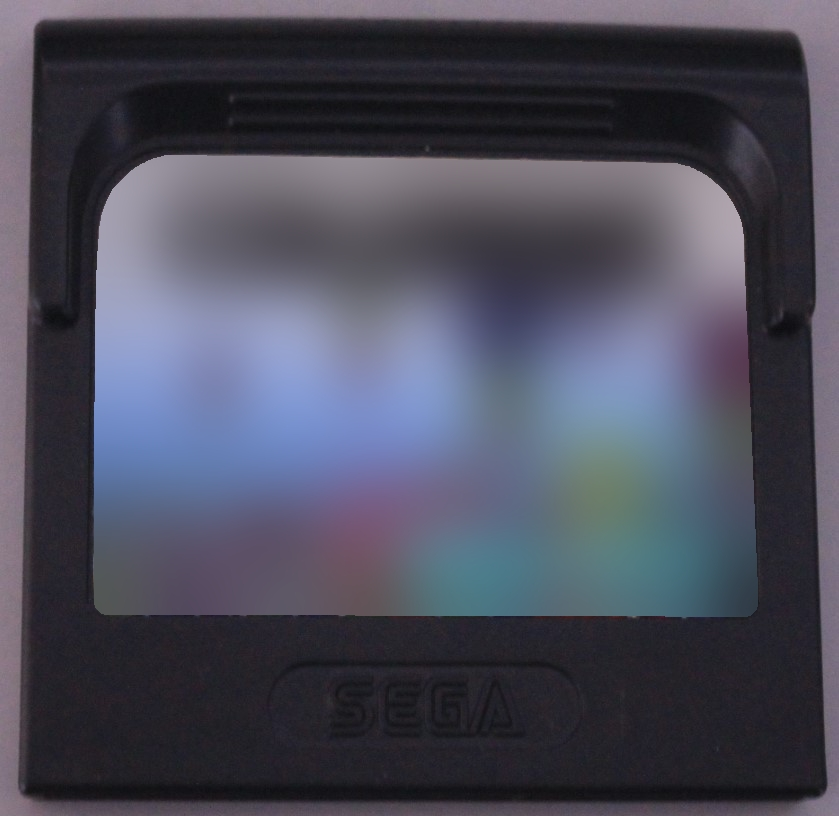
A standard Game Gear cartridge

Over 300 total Game Gear games were released, with six titles available at launch. Prices for game cartridges initially ranged from $24.99 to $29.99 in the United States. The casings are molded black plastic with a rounded front to aid in removal. Games include Sonic the Hedgehog, The GG Shinobi, Space Harrier, and Land of Illusion Starring Mickey Mouse, which was considered the best game for the system by GamesRadar+. Later games included entries in franchises that had originated on the successful 16-bit Genesis. Much of the Game Gear's library consists of Master System ports. Because of the landscape orientation of the Game Gear's screen and the similarities to Master System hardware, it was easy for developers to port Master System games to the Game Gear.

Because of Nintendo's control over the console video game market, few third-party developers were available to create games for Sega's systems. This contributed to the many ports from Master System. Likewise, because of this, much of the Game Gear library is unique among handhelds, pulling sales away from the Atari Lynx and NEC TurboExpress and helping to establish the Game Gear's market position. However, the Game Boy's library includes over 1000 individual games. Several Game Gear games were released years later on the Nintendo 3DS's Virtual Console service on the Nintendo eShop. The emulator for the Virtual Console releases was handled by M2.

== Game Gear Micro ==
On June 3, 2020, as part of the company's 60th anniversary, Sega revealed the Game Gear Micro (Note: ゲームギアミクロ, Gēmu gia mikuro) dedicated console. The Micro was released in Japan on October 6, 2020, through Japanese storefronts in four different versions, varying in color and the game selection, with each containing four separate Game Gear games. Each unit otherwise is the same size, measuring 80 mm × 43 mm × 20 mm (3.15 in × 1.69 in × 0.79 in) with a 29 mm (1.1 in) display, and is powered by 2 AAA batteries or through a separate USB charger. Each unit also includes a headphone jack. A magnifying accessory modeled after the original system's Big Window accessory was included with preorders. A special version of the device (published by M2 and licensed by Sega) was being shipped with a limited edition of Aleste Collection in December 2020. This version includes a newly developed Game Gear title G.G. Aleste 3 as well as four other Aleste titles.

== Reception ==
Game Gear surpassed the Atari Lynx and NEC TurboExpress, but lagged far behind the Game Boy in the handheld marketplace. Retrospective reception to the Game Gear is mixed. In 2008, GamePro listed the Game Gear as 10th on its list of the "10 Worst-Selling Handhelds of All Time" and criticized aspects of the implementation of its technology, but also stated that the Game Gear could be considered a commercial success at nearly 11 million units sold. According to GamePro reviewer Blake Snow, "Unlike the Game Boy, the Game Gear rocked the landscape holding position, making it less cramped for human beings with two hands to hold. And even though the Game Gear could be considered a success, its bulky frame, relative high price, constant consumption of AA batteries, and a lack of appealing games ultimately kept Sega from releasing a true successor." In speaking with Famitsu DC for its November 1998 issue, Sato stated that the Game Gear achieved "a respectable chunk of market share" since overall "about 14 million systems" were sold, but that "Nintendo's Game Boy was such a runaway success, and had gobbled up so much of the market, that our success was still seen as a failure, which I think is a shame."

GamesRadar+ offered some praise for the system and its library, stating: "With its 8-bit processor and bright color screen, it was basically the Sega Master System in your hands. How many batteries did we suck dry playing Sonic, Madden and Road Rash on the bus or in the car, or in the dark when we were supposed to be sleeping? You couldn't do that on a Game Boy!" By contrast, IGN reviewer Levi Buchanan opined that the Game Gear's biggest fault was its game library when compared to the Game Boy, stating: "the software was completely lacking compared to its chief rival, which was bathed in quality games. It didn't matter that the Game Gear was more powerful. The color screen did not reverse any fortunes. Content and innovation beat out technology, a formula that Nintendo is using right now with the continued ascendance of the DS and Wii." Buchanan praised some of the library: "Some of those Master System tweaks were very good games, and fun is resilient against time." Retro Gamer praised Sega's accomplishment in surviving against the competition of Nintendo in the handheld console market with the Game Gear, noting that "for all the handhelds that have gone up against the might of Nintendo and ultimately lost out, Sega's Game Gear managed to last the longest, only outdone in sales by the Sony PSP. For its fans, it will remain a piece of classic gaming hardware whose legacy lives on forever."

== See also ==
- Watara Supervision
- Gamate
