= TurboGrafx-16 =

Fourth-generation home video game console

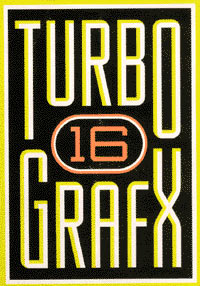

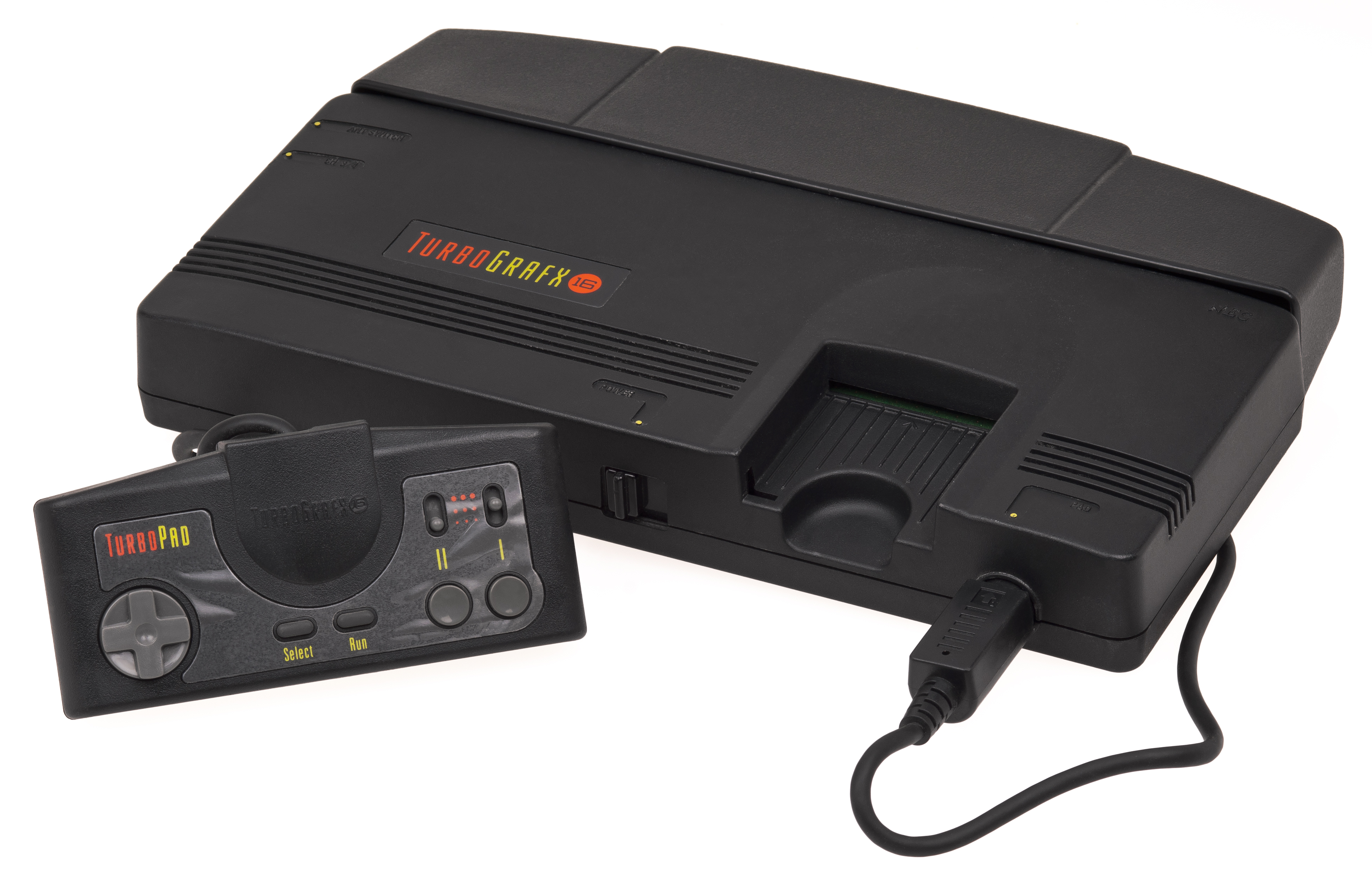
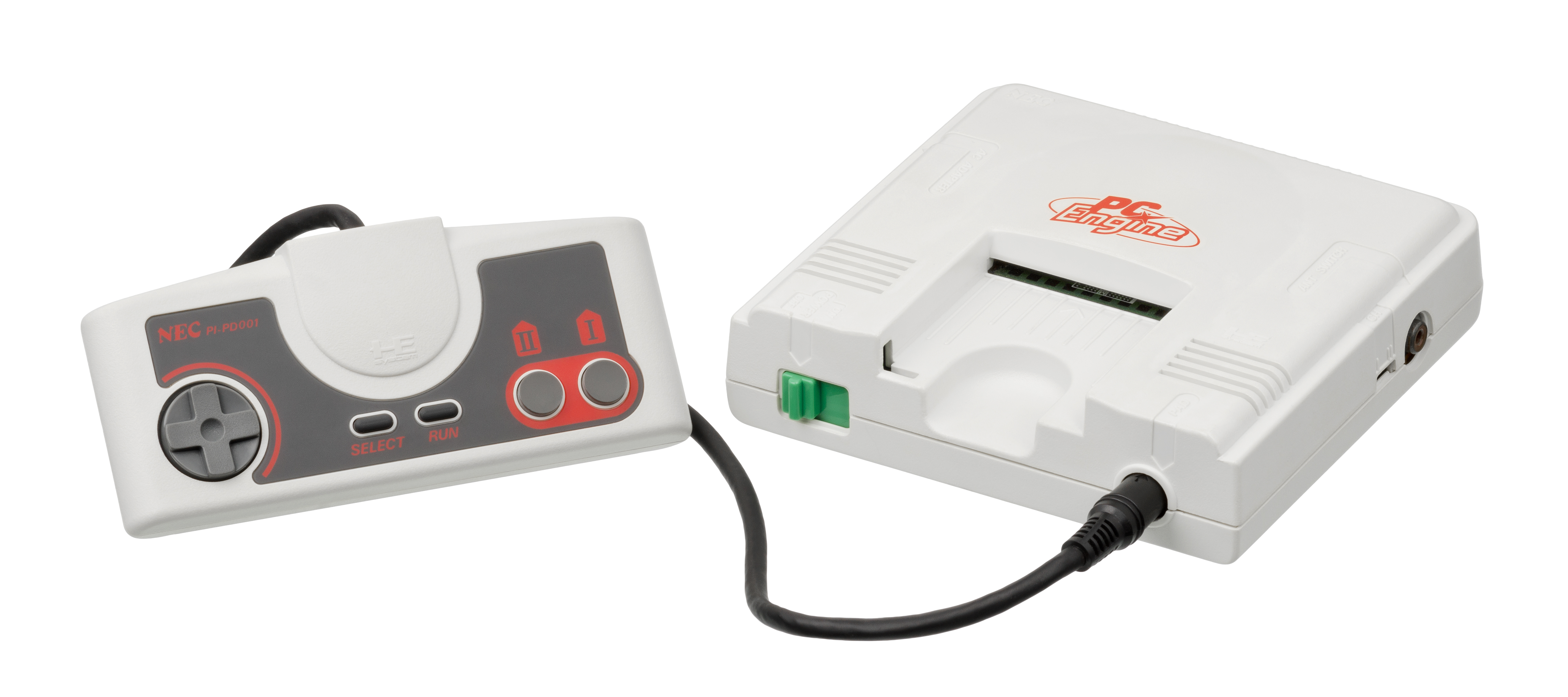
- North American TurboGrafx-16 (top) and the original Japanese PC Engine (bottom)
- Manufacturer: NEC; Hudson Soft
- Type: Home video game console
- Generation: Fourth
- Released: JP: October 30, 1987; NA: August 29, 1989; FR: November 22, 1989; GB: December 21, 1989; ESP: August 21, 1990
- Lifespan: 1987–1994
- Discontinued: FR: December 25, 1993; NA: May 11, 1994; JP: December 16, 1994
- Units sold: 10 million (HuCard only); 1.92 million (CD-ROM^{2} + Duo)
- Media: HuCard
- CPU: HuC6280 @ 7.16 MHz
- Memory: 8 KB RAM; 64 KB Video RAM
- Display: Composite or RF TV out; 565×242 or 256×239, 512 color palette, 482 colors on-screen
- Graphics: HuC6270 VDC; HuC6260 VCE
- Sound: PSG, 5 to 10-bit stereo PCM
- Best-selling game: Bonk's Adventure
- Successor: PC Engine SuperGrafx; PC-FX
- Related: LaserActive

The TurboGrafx-16, known as the PC Engine (Note: Japanese: PCエンジン, Hepburn: Pīshī Enjin) outside North America, is a home video game console developed by Hudson Soft and manufactured by NEC. It was released in Japan in 1987 and in North America in 1989. The first console of the fourth generation, it launched in Japan to compete with Nintendo's Family Computer, but its delayed U.S. debut placed it against the more advanced Sega Genesis and later the Super NES.

The TurboGrafx-16 features an 8-bit CPU paired with dual 16-bit graphics processors, and supports up to 482 on-screen colors from a palette of 512. The "16" in the console’s North American branding was criticized as misleading. With dimensions of 14 by 14 by 3.5 centimeters (5.5 in × 5.5 in × 1.4 in), the PC Engine remains the smallest major home console ever released.

Games were initially released on HuCard cartridges, but the platform later supported additional formats requiring separate hardware: TurboGrafx-CD (CD-ROM² in Japan) games on compact disc, SuperGrafx games on a new console variant, and LD-ROM² games on LaserDisc via the LaserActive, a TurboGrafx-compatible system developed by Pioneer. No configuration supported all formats simultaneously. While the TurboGrafx-CD was moderately successful, the other two formats failed to gain traction. The resulting hardware fragmentation created consumer confusion.

The PC Engine was a commercial success in Japan, receiving strong third-party support and serving as the Super Famicom's main competitor. In contrast, the TurboGrafx-16 struggled in North America due to limited marketing, a smaller game library, and its late release. In Europe, Japanese models were grey-market imported and modified for local sale, but plans for an official release were canceled following poor U.S. performance. Over 17 hardware variants were produced, including portable models and versions integrating the CD-ROM add-on. Production of the final model ended in 1994. It was succeeded by the PC-FX, released exclusively in Japan, which was a commercial failure.

== History ==
The PC Engine was created as a collaborative effort between Hudson Soft, who created video game software, and NEC, a company which was dominant in the Japanese personal computer market with their PC-88 and PC-98 platforms. NEC lacked the vital experience in the video gaming industry and approached numerous video game studios for support. By pure coincidence, NEC's interest in entering the lucrative video game market coincided with Hudson's failed attempt to sell designs for then-advanced graphics chips to Nintendo; in July 1985, Hudson Soft approached and pitched them a new add-on for the Famicom that played games using their patented Bee Cards, which they had experimented with on the MSX computer. Nintendo liked this concept, as it had the ability to store full games and overwrite existing ones. However, due to the cost of the technology, and the fact that they would be required to pay royalties for each card sold, Nintendo ultimately decided to pass on Hudson Soft's proposal. This eventually led to the partnership between Hudson Soft and NEC. The two companies successfully teamed up to then develop the PC Engine.

The system made its debut in the Japanese market on October 30, 1987, and it was a tremendous success. The PC Engine had an elegant, "eye-catching" design, and it was very small compared to its rivals. The PC Engine sold 500,000 units in its first week of release.

The CD-ROM expansion was a major success for the CD-ROM format, selling 60,000 units in its first five months of release in Japan. By 1989, NEC had sold over 1.2 million consoles and more than 80,000 CD-ROM units in Japan.

In 1988, NEC decided to expand to the American market and directed its U.S. operations to develop the system for the new audience. NEC Technologies boss Keith Schaefer formed a team to test the system. They found out that there was a lack of enthusiasm in its name "PC Engine" and also felt its small size was not very suitable to American consumers who would generally prefer a larger and "futuristic" design. They decided to call the system the "TurboGrafx-16", a name representing its graphical speed and strength and its 16-bit GPU. They also completely redesigned the hardware into a large, black casing. This lengthy redesign process and NEC's questions about the system's viability in the United States delayed the TurboGrafx-16's debut.

The TurboGrafx-16 (branded as the TurboGrafx-16 Entertainment SuperSystem on the packaging and promotional material) was eventually released in the New York City and Los Angeles test markets in late August 1989. However, this was two weeks after Sega of America released the Sega Genesis with a 16-bit CPU to test markets. Unlike NEC, Sega did not waste time redesigning the original Japanese Mega Drive system, making only slight aesthetic changes.

The Genesis quickly eclipsed the TurboGrafx-16 after its American debut. NEC's decision to pack-in Keith Courage in Alpha Zones, a Hudson Soft game unknown to western gamers, proved costly as Sega packed-in a port of the hit arcade title Altered Beast with the Genesis. NEC's American operations in Chicago were also overhyped about its potential and quickly produced 750,000 units, far above actual demand. This was very profitable for Hudson Soft as NEC paid Hudson Soft royalties for every console produced, whether sold or not. By 1990, it was clear that the system was performing very poorly and NEC could not compete with Nintendo and Sega's marketing.

In late 1989, NEC announced plans for a coin-op arcade video game version of the TurboGrafx-16. However, NEC cancelled the plans in early 1990.

In Europe, the console is known by its original Japanese name PC Engine, rather than its American name TurboGrafx-16. PC Engine imports from Japan drew a cult following, with a number of unauthorized PC Engine imports available along with NTSC-to-PAL adapters in the United Kingdom during the late 1980s. In 1989, a British company called Mention manufactured an adapted PAL version called the PC Engine Plus. However, the system was not officially supported by NEC. From November 1989 to 1993, PC Engine consoles as well as some add-ons were imported from Japan by French importer Sodipeng (Société de Distribution de la PC Engine), a subsidiary of Guillemot International. This came after considerable enthusiasm in the French press. The PC Engine was largely available in France and Benelux through major retailers. It came with French language instructions and also an AV cable to enable its compatibility with SECAM television sets.

After seeing the TurboGrafx-16 falter in America, NEC decided to cancel their European releases. Units for the European markets were already produced, which were essentially US models modified to run on PAL television sets. NEC sold this stock to distributors; in the United Kingdom, Telegames released the console in 1990 in extremely limited quantities.

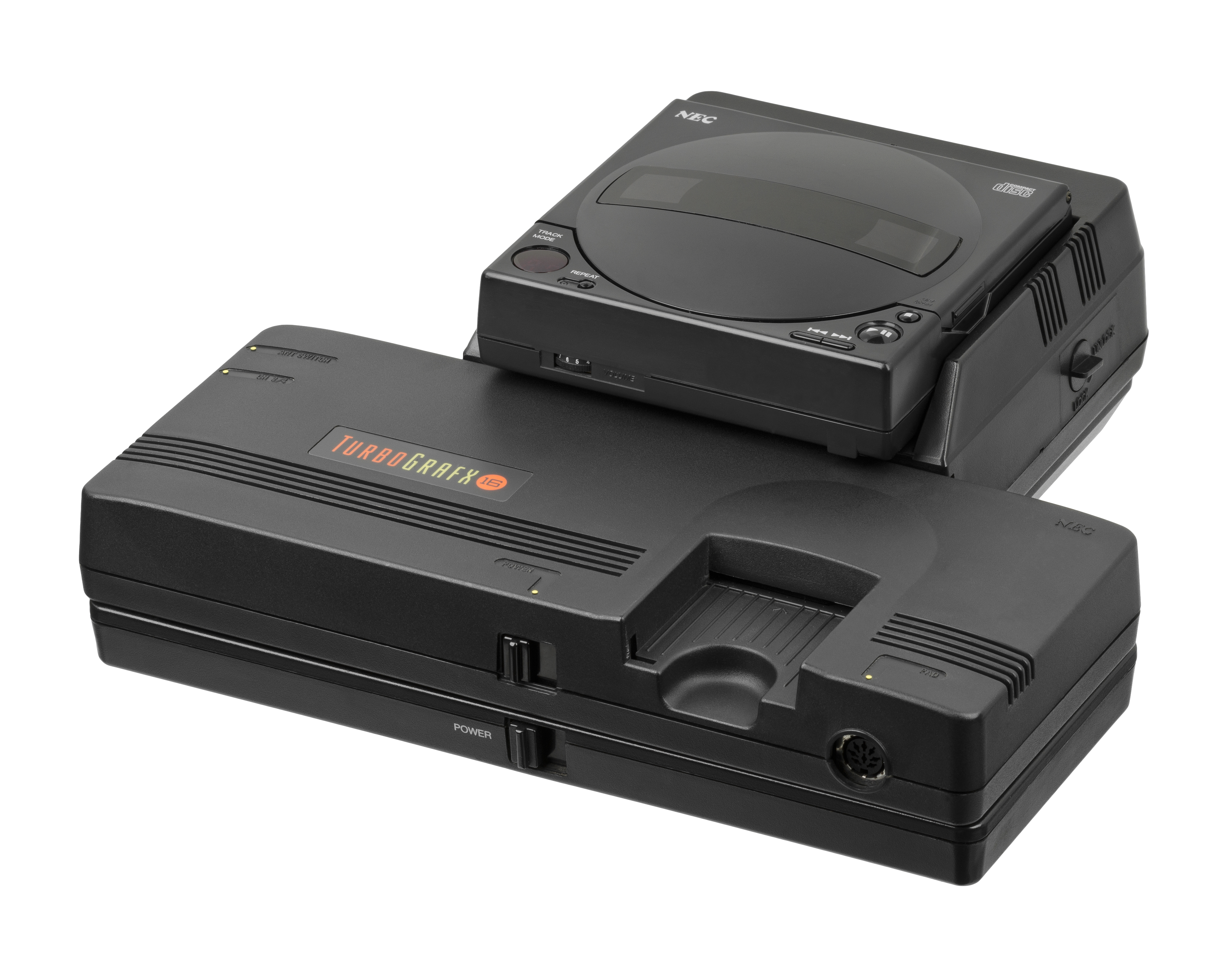
The TurboGrafx-16/PC Engine was the first video game console capable of playing CD-ROM games with an optional add-on.

By March 1991, NEC reported that it had sold 750,000 TurboGrafx-16 consoles in the United States and 500,000 CD-ROM units worldwide.

In an effort to relaunch the system in the North American market, in mid-1992 NEC and Hudson Soft transferred management of the system in North America to a new joint venture called Turbo Technologies, Inc. (TTI), which supplanted NEC Technologies, Inc., and released the TurboDuo, an all-in-one unit that included the CD-ROM drive built in. However, the North American console gaming market continued to be dominated by the Genesis and Super NES, which was released in North America in August 1991. In May 1994, Turbo Technologies announced that it was dropping support for the Duo, though it would continue to offer repairs for existing units and provide ongoing software releases through independent companies in the U.S. and Canada.

In Japan, NEC had sold a total of 10 million PC Engine units as of 1995 of which CD-ROM² units and the Duo combied contributed 1.92 million as of March 1996. This adds up to a total of more than 11.92 million PC Engine/TurboGrafx units sold in Japan and the United States as of 1995. The final licensed release for the PC Engine was Dead of the Brain Part 1 & 2 on June 3, 1999, on the Super CD-ROM² format.

== Add-ons ==
=== CD-ROM² / TurboGrafx-CD ===
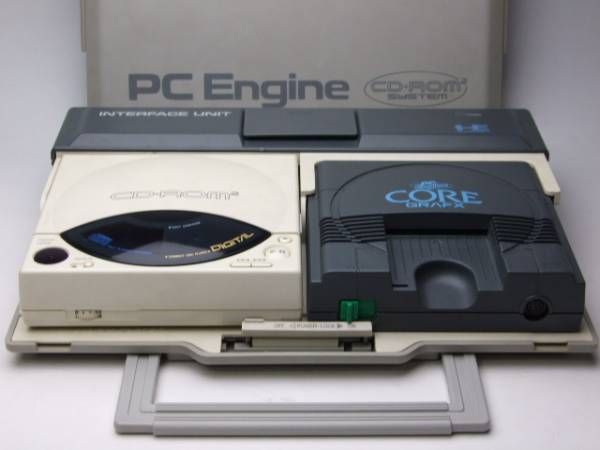
PC Engine CoreGrafx with CD-ROM² and interface unit

The CD-ROM² (シーディーロムロム, pronounced "CD-ROM-ROM", rather than "CD-ROM 2" or "CD-ROM Squared") is an add-on attachment for the PC Engine that was released in Japan on December 4, 1988. The add-on allows the core versions of the console to play PC Engine games in CD-ROM format in addition to standard HuCards. This made the PC Engine the first video game console to use CD-ROM as a storage medium. The add-on comprised the CD-ROM drive itself, and an interface unit that connects the drive to the console, and supplies power to both devices.

NEC marketed the TurboGrafx-CD, the North American version of the drive, in November 1989. The TurboGrafx-CD was designed to match and interface with the TurboGrafx-16 console. In the United States, the drive had a launch price of $399.99, and did not include any bundled games. Fighting Street and Monster Lair were the TurboGrafx-CD launch titles; Ys Book I & II soon followed.

=== Super CD-ROM² ===
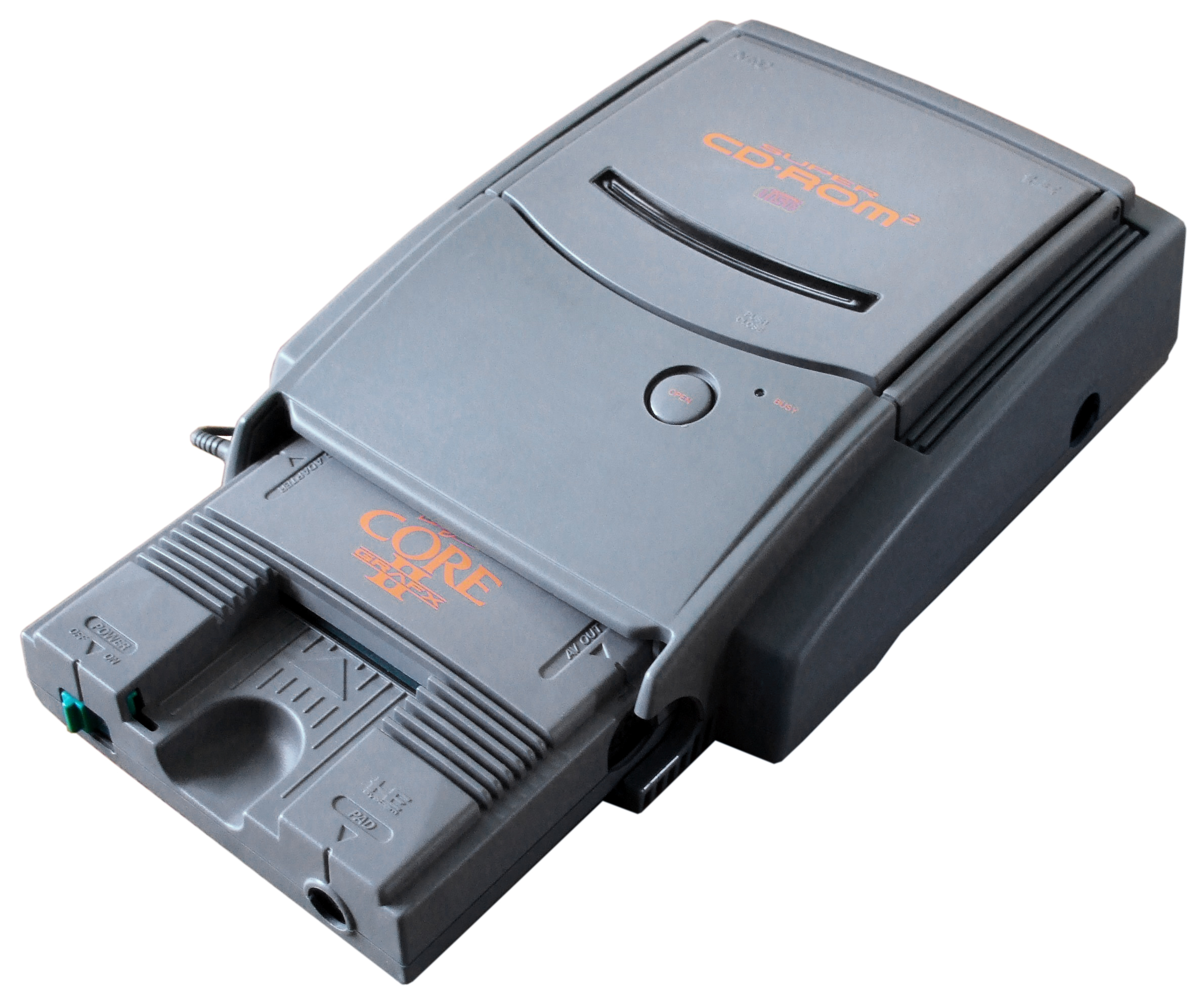
Super CD-ROM² attached to a CoreGrafx II

In 1991, NEC introduced an upgraded version of the CD-ROM² System known as the Super CD-ROM², which updates the BIOS to Version 3.0 and increases buffer RAM from 64 KB to 256 KB. This upgrade was released in several forms: the first was the PC Engine Duo on September 21, a new model of the console with a CD-ROM drive and upgraded BIOS/RAM already built into the system. This was followed by the Super System Card released on October 26, an upgrade for the existing CD-ROM² add-on that serves as a replacement to the original System Card. PC Engine owners who did not already own the original CD-ROM² add-on could instead opt for the Super-CD-ROM² unit, an updated version of the add-on released on December 13, which combines the CD-ROM drive, interface unit and Super System Card into one device.

=== Arcade Card ===
On March 12, 1994, NEC introduced a third upgrade known as the Arcade Card (アーケードカード, Ākēdo Kādo), which increases the amount of onboard RAM of the Super CD-ROM² System to 2MB. This upgrade was released in two models: the Arcade Card Duo, designed for PC Engine consoles already equipped with the Super CD-ROM² System, and the Arcade Card Pro, a model for the original CD-ROM² System that combines the functionalities of the Super System Card and Arcade Card Duo into one. The first games for this add-on were ports of the Neo-Geo fighting games Fatal Fury 2 and Art of Fighting. Ports of World Heroes 2 and Fatal Fury Special were later released for this card, along with several original games released under the Arcade CD-ROM² standard. By this point, support for both the TurboGrafx-16 and Turbo Duo was already waning in North America; thus, no North American version of either Arcade Card was produced, though a Japanese Arcade Card can still be used on a North American console through a HuCard converter.

== Variations ==
Many variations and related products of the PC Engine were released.

=== CoreGrafx ===
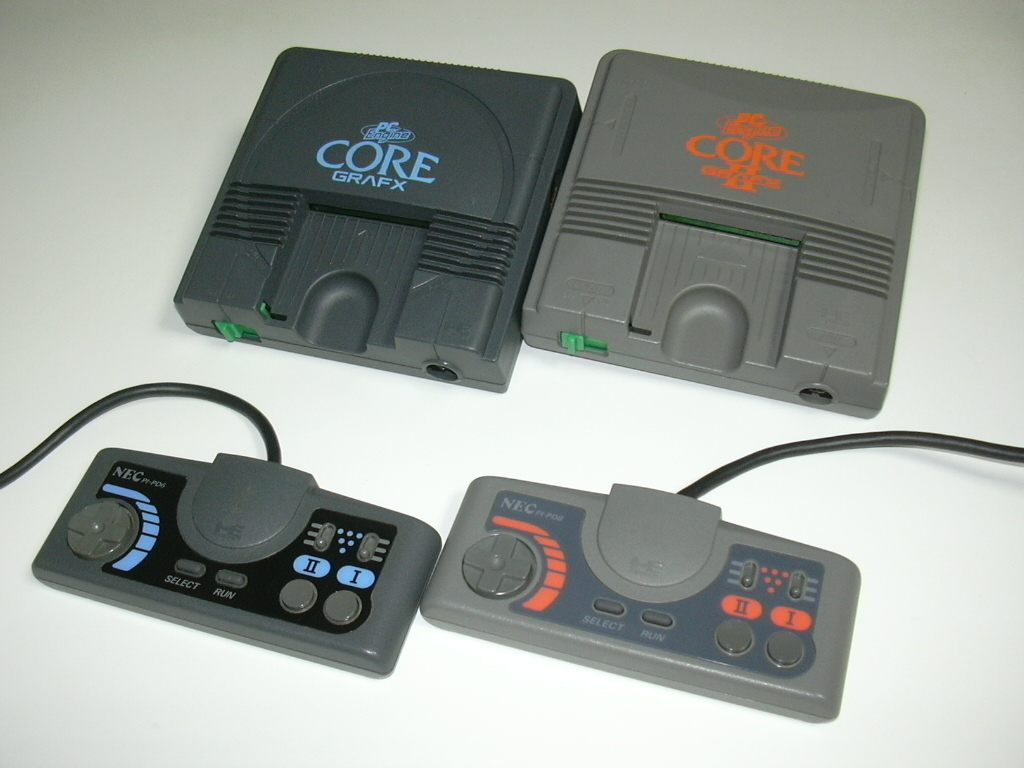
CoreGrafx and CoreGrafx II

The PC Engine CoreGrafx is an updated model of the PC Engine, released in Japan on December 8, 1989. It has the same form factor as the original PC Engine, but it changes the color scheme from white and red to black and blue and replaces the original's radio frequency-output connector with a composite video AV port. It also used a revised CPU, the HuC6280A, which supposedly fixed some minor audio issues. A recolored version of the model, known as the PC Engine CoreGrafx II, was released on June 21, 1991. Aside from the different coloring (light grey and orange), it is nearly identical to the original CoreGrafx except that the CPU was changed back to the original HuC6280.

=== SuperGrafx ===
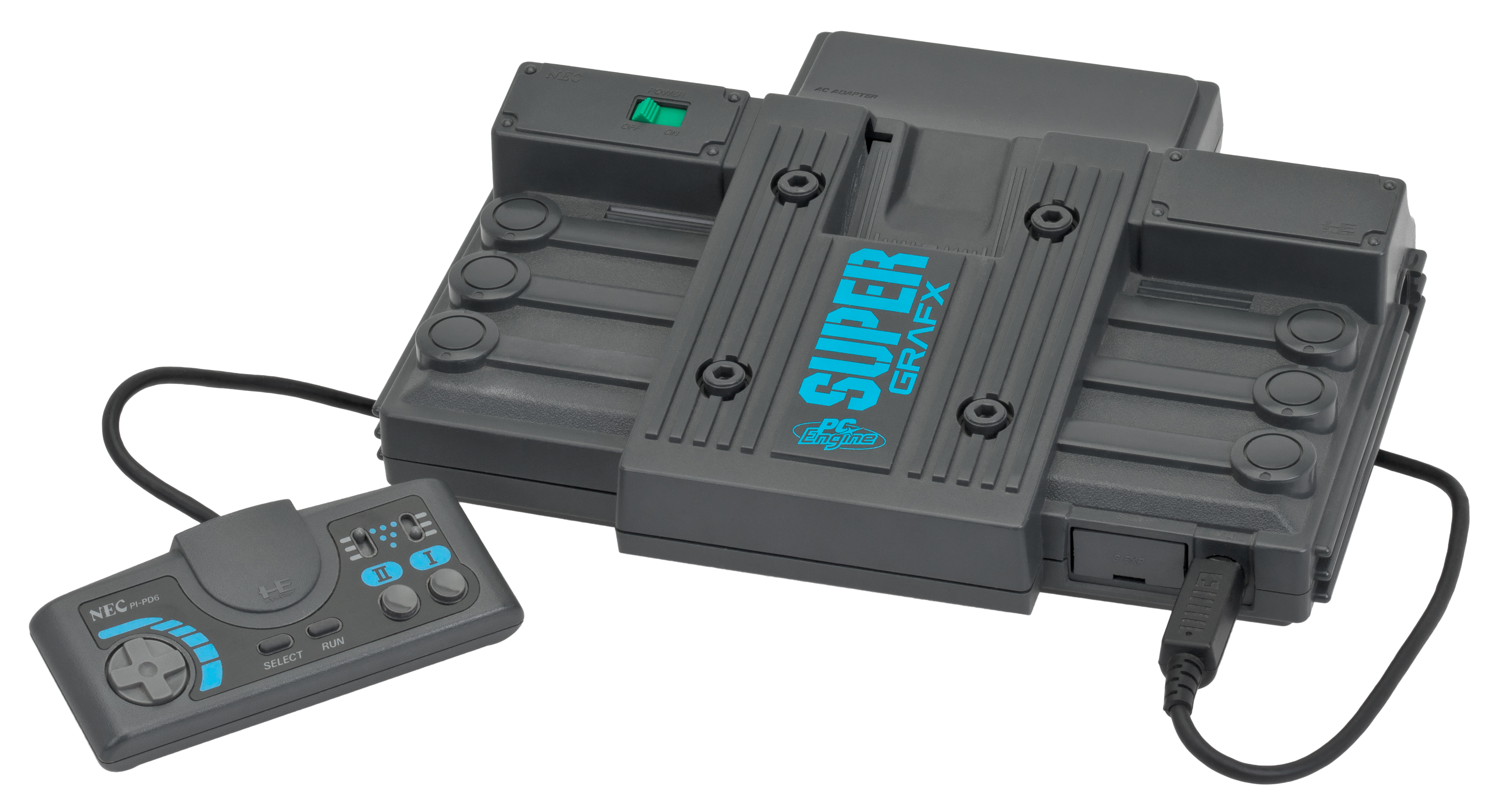
PC Engine SuperGrafx system

The PC Engine SuperGrafx, released on the same day as the CoreGrafx in Japan, is an enhanced variation of the PC Engine hardware with updated specs. This model has a second HuC6270A (VDC), a HuC6202 (VDP) that combines the output of the two VDCs, four times as much RAM, twice as much video RAM, and a second layer/plane of scrolling. It also uses the revised HuC6280A CPU, but the sound and color palette were not upgraded, making the expensive price tag a big disadvantage to the system. As a result, only five exclusive SuperGrafx games and two hybrid games (Darius Plus and Darius Alpha were released as standard HuCards which took advantage of the extra video hardware if played on a SuperGrafx) were released, and the system was quickly discontinued. The SuperGrafx has the same expansion port as previous PC Engine consoles, but requires an adapter in order to utilize the original CD-ROM² System add-on, due to the SuperGrafx console's large size.

=== Shuttle ===
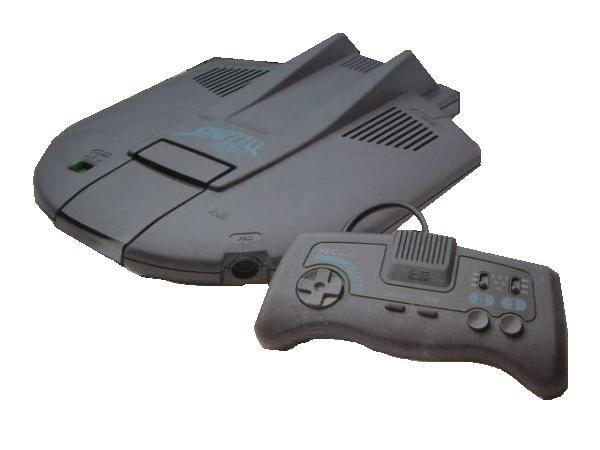
PC Engine Shuttle

The PC Engine Shuttle was released in Japan on November 22, 1989, as a less expensive model of the console, retailing at ¥18,800. It was targeted primarily towards younger players with its spaceship-like design and came bundled with a TurboPad II controller, which is shaped differently from the other standard TurboPad controllers. The reduced price was made possible by removing the expansion port from the back, making it the first model of the console that was not compatible with the CD-ROM² add-on. However, it does have a slot for a memory backup unit, which is required for certain games. The RF output used on the original PC Engine was also replaced with an A/V port for the Shuttle.

The PC Engine Shuttle was also distributed in South Korea. It was released in 1990 by Daewoo Electronics.

=== TurboExpress ===
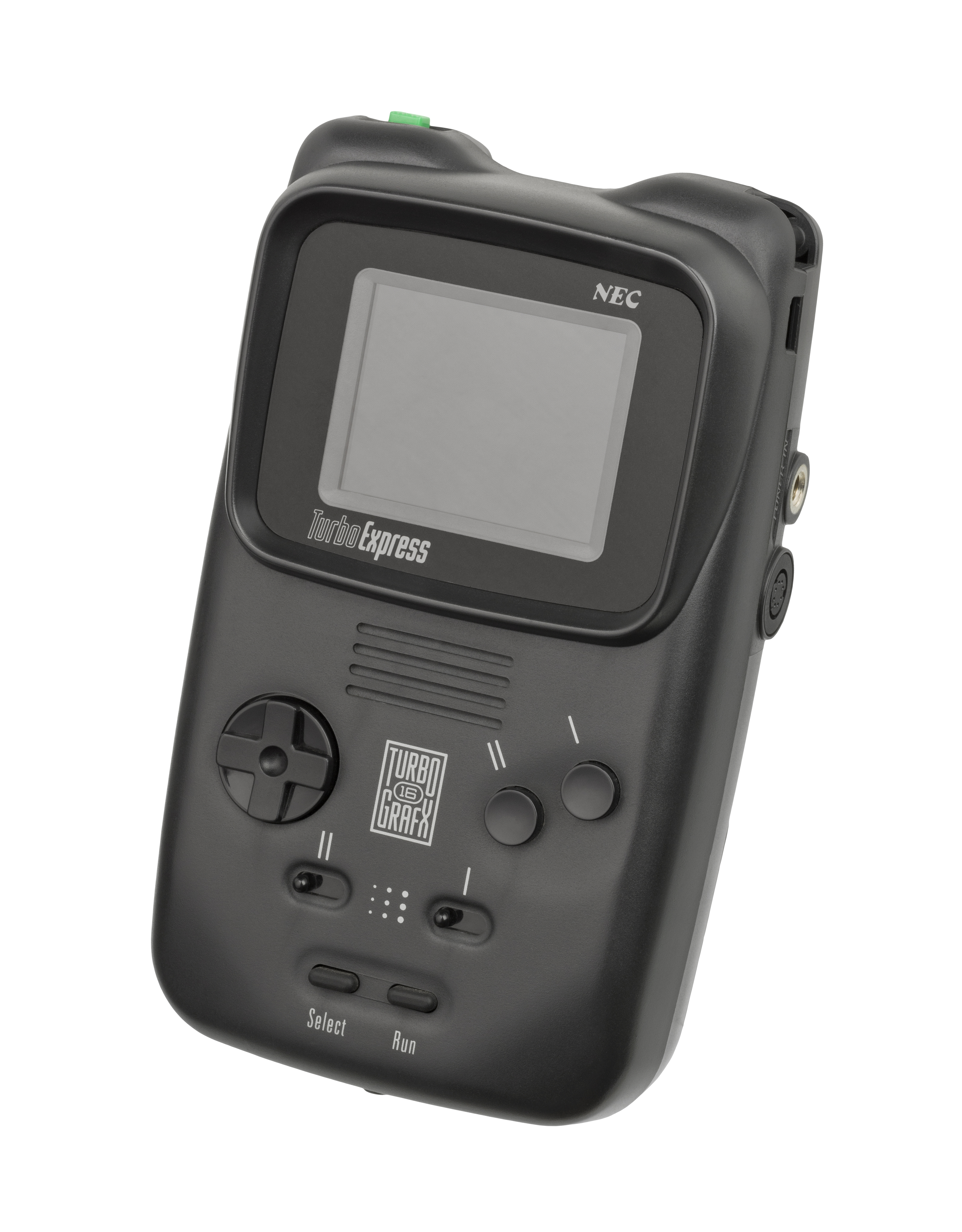
TurboExpress

The TurboExpress, known as the PC Engine GT in Japan, is a portable version of the console released in December 1990. It can play HuCard games on a 2.6-inch (66 mm) backlit, active-matrix color LCD screen, the most advanced on the market for a portable video game unit at the time. The screen contributed to its high price and short battery life, however, which hurt its performance in the market. It also has a TV tuner adapter as well as a two-player link cable.

=== LT ===
The PC Engine LT is a model of the console in a laptop form, released on December 13, 1991, in Japan, retailing at ¥99,800. The LT does not require a television display (and does not have any AV output) as it has a built-in flip-up screen and speakers, just as a laptop would have, but, unlike the GT, the LT runs on a power supply. Its expensive price meant that few units were produced compared to other models. The LT has full expansion port capability, so the CD-ROM² unit is compatible with the LT the same way as it is with the original PC Engine and CoreGrafx. However, the LT requires an adapter to use the enhanced Super CD-ROM² unit.

=== Duo ===
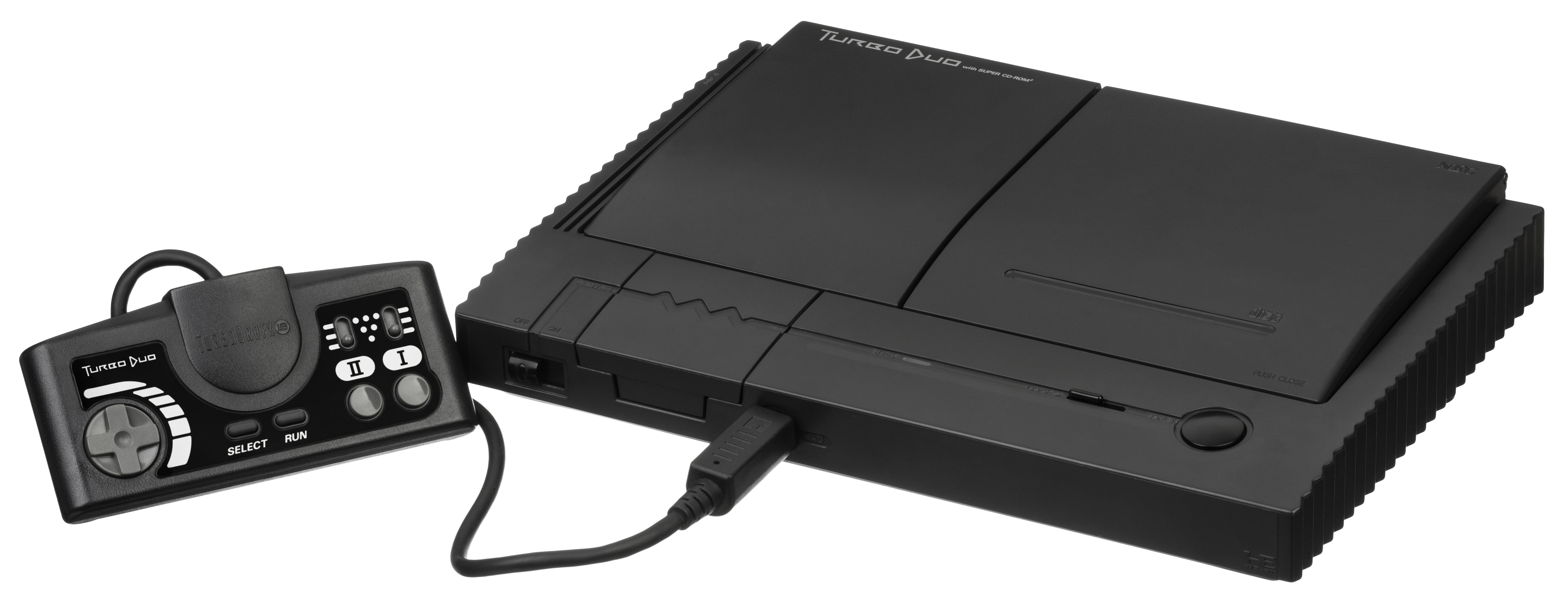
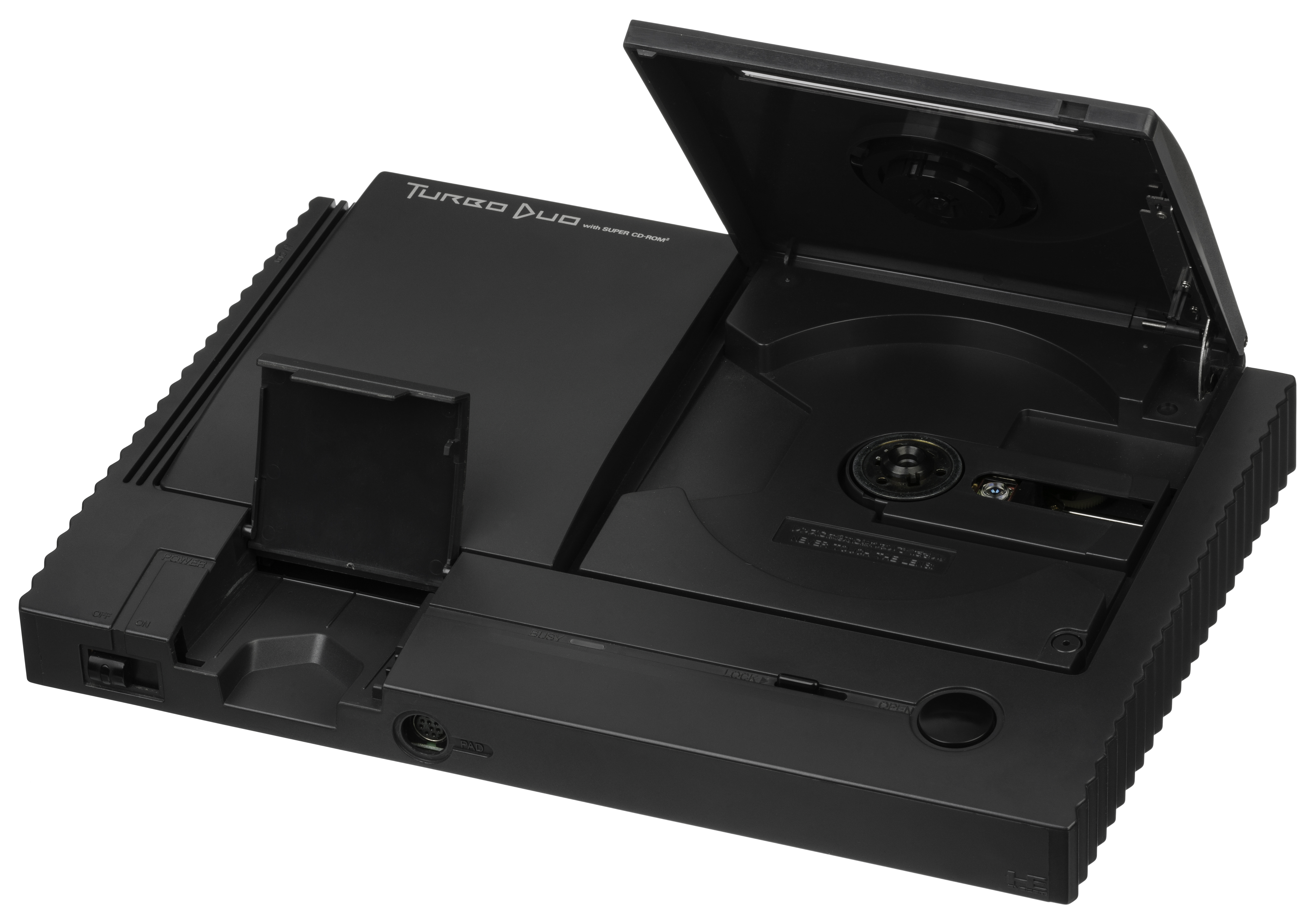
NEC/Turbo Technologies later released the TurboDuo, which combined the TurboGrafx-CD (with the new Super System Card on board) and TurboGrafx-16 into one unit.

NEC Home Electronics released the PC Engine Duo in Japan on September 21, 1991, which combined the PC Engine and Super CD-ROM² unit into a single console. The system can play HuCards, audio CDs, CD+Gs, standard CD-ROM² games and Super CD-ROM² games. The North American version, the TurboDuo, was launched to a limited test market on October 10, 1992, with a national release in early 1993.

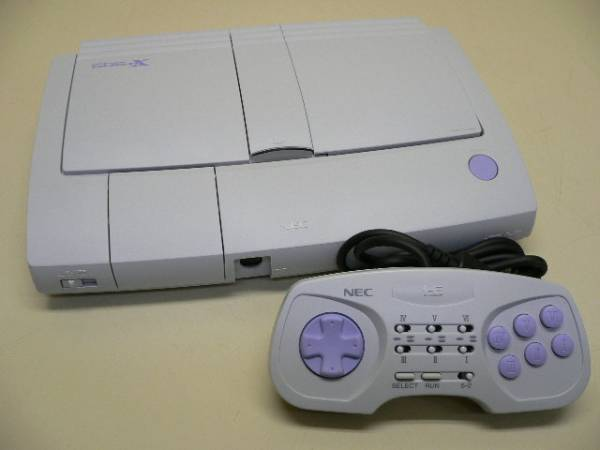
PC Engine Duo RX

Two updated variants were released in Japan: the PC Engine Duo-R on March 25, 1993, and the PC Engine Duo-RX on June 25, 1994. The changes were mostly cosmetic, but the RX included a new 6-button controller.

=== Third-party models ===
The PC-KD863G is a CRT monitor with built-in PC Engine console, released on September 27, 1988, in Japan for ¥138,000. Following NEC's PCs' naming scheme, the PC-KD863G was designed to eliminate the need to buy a separate television set and a console. It output its signals in RGB, so it was clearer at the time than the console which was still limited to RF and composite. However, it has no BUS expansion port, which made it incompatible with the CD-ROM² System and memory backup add-ons.

The X1-Twin was the first licensed PC Engine-compatible hardware manufactured by a third-party company, released by Sharp in April 1989 for ¥99,800. It is a hybrid system that can run PC Engine games and X1 computer software.

Pioneer Corporation's LaserActive supports an add-on module which allows the use of PC Engine games (HuCard, CD-ROM² and Super CD-ROM²) as well as new "LD-ROM²" titles that work only on this device. NEC also released their own LaserActive unit (NEC PCE-LD1) and PC Engine add-on module, under an OEM license. A total of eleven LD-ROM^{2} titles were produced, with only three of them released in North America.

=== Other foreign markets ===
Outside North America and Japan, the TurboGrafx-16 console was released in South Korea by a third-party company, Haitai, under the name Vistar 16. It was based on the American version but with a new curved design. Daewoo Electronics distributed the PC Engine Shuttle in the South Korean market as well.

== Technical specifications ==
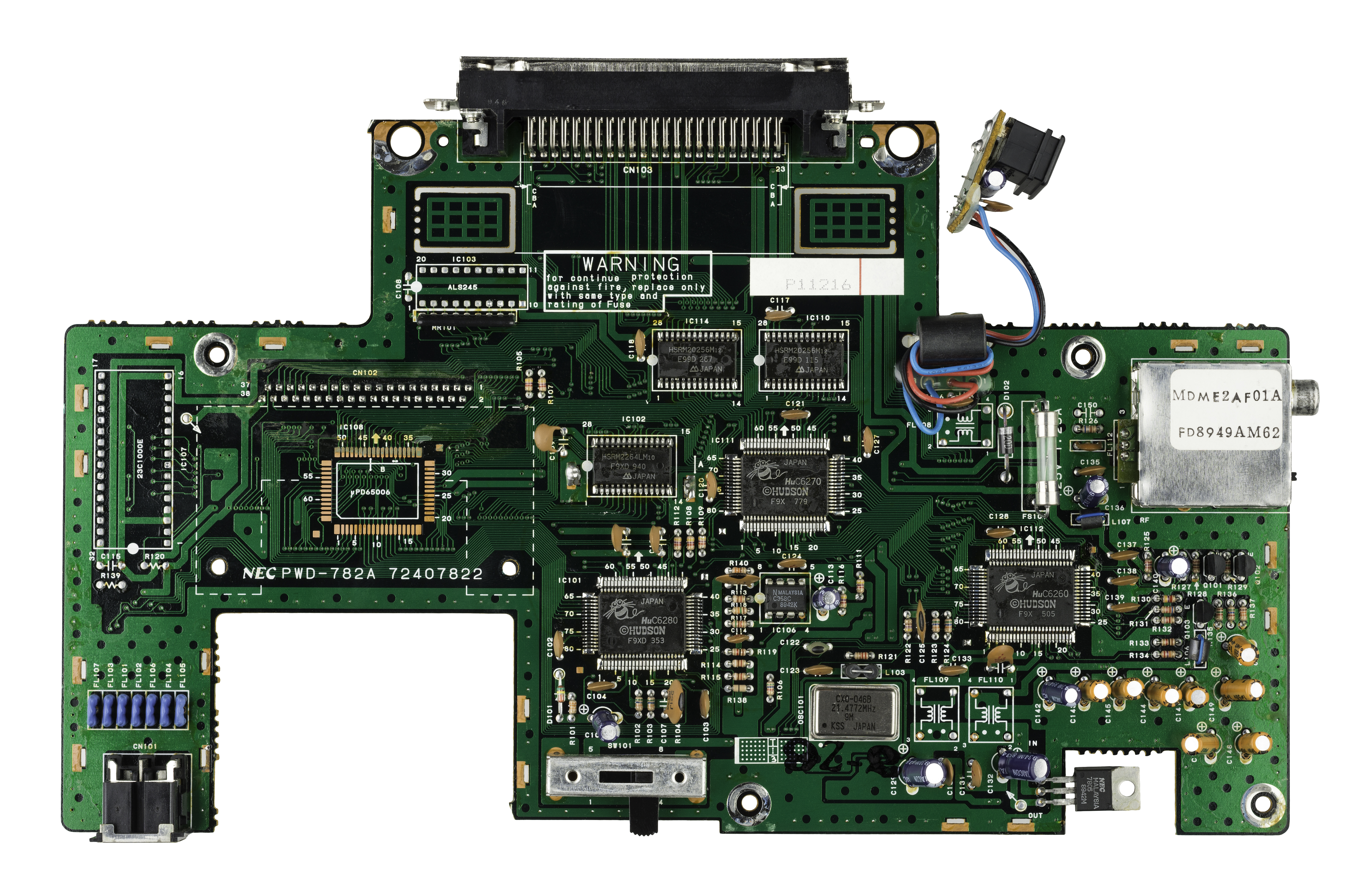
Top view of the motherboard for the TurboGrafx-16

The TurboGrafx-16 uses a Hudson Soft HuC6280 CPU—an 8-bit CPU running at 7.16 MHz paired with two 16-bit graphics processors, a HuC6270 video display controller and a HuC6260 video color encoder. It includes 8 KB of RAM, 64 KB of video RAM, and the ability to display 482 colors at once from a 512-color palette. The sound hardware, built into the CPU, includes a programmable sound generator running at 3.58 MHz and a 5-10 bit stereo PCM.

TurboGrafx-16 games use the HuCard ROM cartridge format, thin credit card-sized cards that insert into the front slot of the console. PC Engine HuCards have 38 connector pins. TurboGrafx-16 HuCards (alternatively referred to as "TurboChips") reverse eight of these pins as a region lockout method. The power switch on the console also acts as a lock that prevents HuCards from being removed while the system is powered on. The European release of the TurboGrafx-16 did not have its own PAL-formatted HuCards as a result of its limited release, with the system instead supporting standard HuCards and outputting a PAL 50 Hz video signal.

=== Peripherals ===
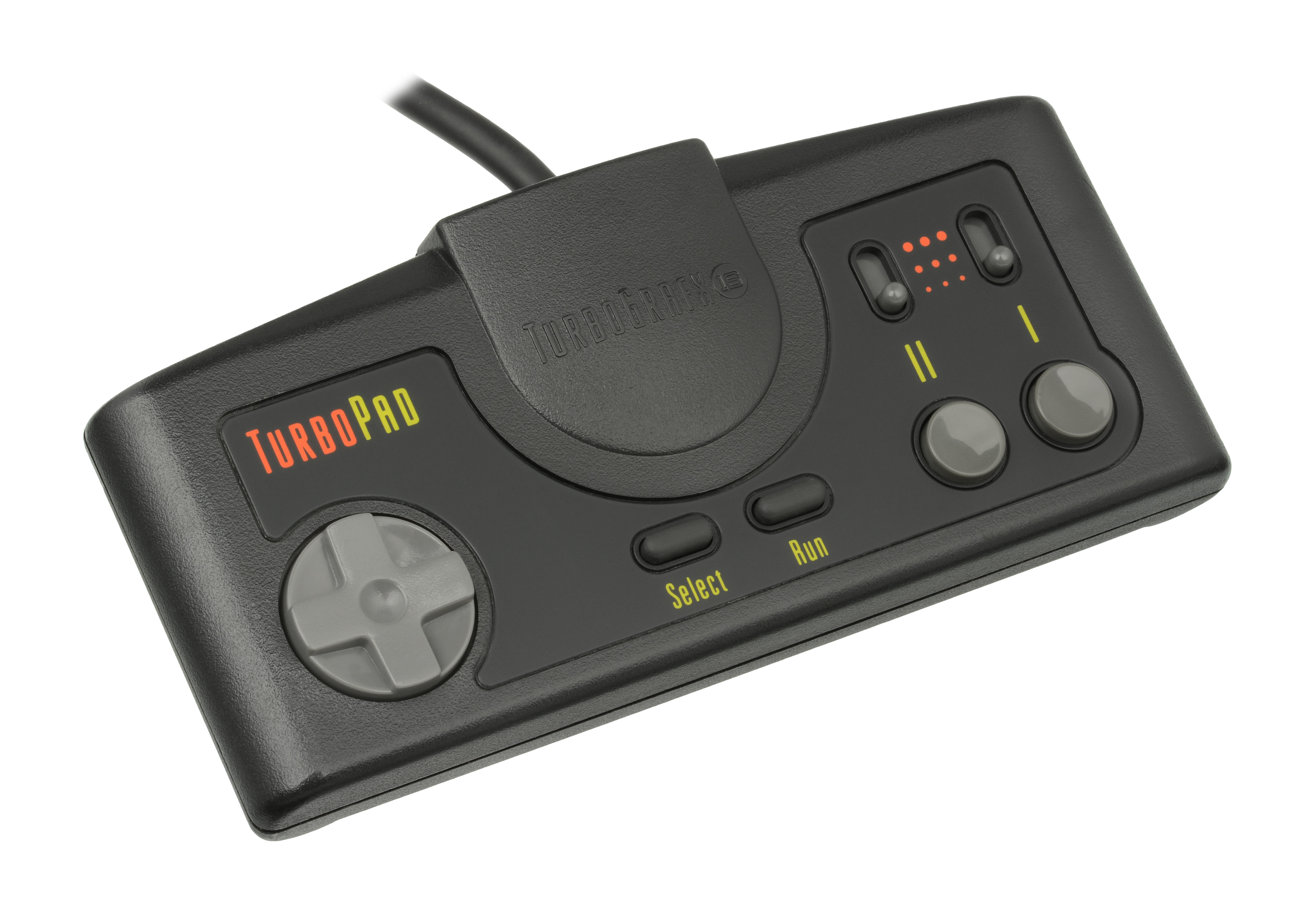
The TurboGrafx-16 TurboPad

In Japan, the PC Engine was originally sold with a standard controller known simply as the Pad. It has a rectangular shape with a directional pad, two action buttons numbered "I" and "II", and two rubber "Select" and "Run" buttons, matching the number of buttons on the Famicom's primary controller (as well as a standard NES controller). Another controller known as the TurboPad was also launched separately with the console, which added two "Turbo" switches for the I and II buttons with three speed settings. The switches allow for a single button press to register multiple inputs at once (for instance, this allows for rapid fire in scrolling shooters). The TurboPad became standard-issue with the TurboGrafx-16 in North America, as well as subsequent models of the PC Engine in Japan starting with the PC Engine Coregrafx, immediately phasing out the original PC Engine Pad.

All PC Engine and TurboGrafx-16 consoles only have one controller port; in order to use multiple controllers on the same system and play multiplayer games, a separate peripheral, known in Japan as the MultiTap and in North America as the TurboTap, was required, which allowed up to five controllers to be plugged into the system. The Cordless Multitap was also available exclusively in Japan, sold as a set with a single Cordless Pad, with additional wireless controllers available separately.

Due to using different diameter controller ports, PC Engine controllers and peripherals are not compatible with TurboGrafx-16 consoles and vice versa. The TurboDuo would revert to using the same controller port that the PC Engine uses, resulting in new TurboDuo-branded versions of the TurboPad and TurboTap peripherals, known as the DuoPad and the DuoTap respectively, to be made. An official TurboGrafx-16/Duo Adapter was also produced, which was an extension cable that allowed any TurboGrafx-16 controller or peripheral to be connected into the TurboDuo console (as well as any PC Engine console as a side effect).

The Virtual Cushion, released in 1992, allows players to feel the impact of enemy attacks through sound vibrations.

Many peripherals were produced for both the TurboGrafx-16 and PC Engine. The TurboStick is a tabletop joystick designed to replicate the standard control layout of arcade games from the era. Other similar joystick controllers were produced by third-party manufacturers, such as the Python 4 by QuickShot and the Stick Engine by ASCII Corporation. The TurboBooster attached to the back of the system and allowed it to output composite video and stereo audio. Hudson released the Ten no Koe 2 in Japan, which enabled the ability to save progress in compatible HuCard titles. In 1991, NEC Avenue released the Avenue Pad 3, which added a third action button labelled "III" that could be assigned via a switch to function as either the Select or Run button, as many games had begun to use one of those for in-game commands. The Avenue Pad 6 was released in 1993 in conjunction with the PC Engine port of Street Fighter II: Champion Edition, adding four action buttons numbered "III" through "VI"; unlike the three-button pad, these buttons did not duplicate existing buttons, and instead added new functionalities in compatible titles. Another six-button controller, the Arcade Pad 6, was released by NEC Home Electronics in 1994, replacing the TurboPad as the bundled controller of the PC Engine Duo-RX (the last model of the console).

== Library ==
A total of 678 commercial games were released for the TurboGrafx-16. In North America, the system featured Keith Courage in Alpha Zones as a pack-in game, a conversion of the PC Engine title Mashin Eiyuuden Wataru. The PC Engine console received strong third-party support in Japan, while the TurboGrafx-16 console struggled to gain the attention of other developers. Hudson brought over many of its popular franchises, such as Bomberman, Bonk, and Adventure Island, to the system with graphically impressive follow-ups. Hudson also designed and published several original titles, such as Air Zonk and Dungeon Explorer. Compile published Alien Crush and Devil's Crush, two well-received virtual pinball games. Namco contributed several high-quality conversions of its arcade games, such as Valkyrie no Densetsu, Pac-Land, Galaga '88, Final Lap Twin, and Splatterhouse, as did Capcom with a port of Street Fighter II: Champion Edition.

A large portion of the TurboGrafx-16's library is made up of horizontal and vertical-scrolling shooters. Examples include Konami's Gradius and Salamander, Hudson's Super Star Soldier and Soldier Blade, Namco's Galaga '88, Irem's R-Type, and Taito's Darius Alpha, Darius Plus and Super Darius. The console is also known for its platformers and role-playing games; Victor Entertainment's The Legendary Axe won numerous awards and is seen among the TurboGrafx-16's definitive titles. Ys I & II, a compilation of two games from Nihon Falcom's Ys series, was particularly successful in Japan. Cosmic Fantasy 2 was an RPG ported from Japan to the United States, which earned an Electronic Gaming Magazine RPG of the Year award in 1993.

== Reception ==
In Japan, the PC Engine was very successful, and at one point it was the top-selling console in the nation. In North America and Europe, the situation was reversed, with both Sega and Nintendo dominating the console market at the expense of NEC. Initially, the TurboGrafx-16 sold well in the U.S., but eventually, it suffered from a lack of support from third-party software developers and publishers.

In 1990, ACE magazine praised the console's racing game library, stating that, compared to "all the popular consoles, the PC Engine is way out in front in terms of the range and quality of its race games." Reviewing the Turbo Duo model in 1993, GamePro gave it a "thumbs down". Though they praised the system's CD sound, graphics, and five-player capability, they criticized the outdated controller and the games library, saying the third-party support was "almost nonexistent" and that most of the first party games were localizations of games better suited to the Japanese market. In 2009, the TurboGrafx-16 was ranked the 13th greatest video game console of all time by IGN, citing "a solid catalog of games worth playing," but also a lack of third-party support and the absence of a second controller port.

The controversy over bit width marketing strategy reappeared with the advent of the Atari Jaguar console. Mattel did not market its 1979 Intellivision system with bit width, although it used a 16-bit CPU.

== Legacy ==
In 1994, NEC released a new console, the Japanese-exclusive PC-FX, a 32-bit system with a tower-like design. It was a commercial failure, leading NEC to abandon the video game industry.

Emulation programs for the TurboGrafx-16 exist for several modern and retro operating systems and architectures. Popular and regularly updated programs include Mednafen and BizHawk.

In 2006, a number of TurboGrafx-16 (TurboChip/HuCARD), TurboGrafx-CD (CD-ROM²) and Turbo Duo (Super CD-ROM²) games were released on Nintendo's Virtual Console download service for the Wii, and later the Wii U, and Nintendo 3DS, including several that were originally never released outside Japan. In 2011, ten TurboGrafx-16 games were released on the PlayStation Network for play on the PlayStation 3 and PlayStation Portable in the North American region.

In 2010, Hudson released an iPhone application entitled "TurboGrafx-16 GameBox" which allowed users to buy and play a number of select Turbo Grafx games via in-app purchases.

The 2012 JRPG Hyperdimension Neptunia Victory features a character, known as Peashy, that pays homage to the console.

In 2016, rapper Kanye West's eighth solo album was initially announced to be titled Turbo Grafx 16. The album, however, was eventually scrapped.

In 2019, Konami announced at E3 2019 and at Tokyo Game Show 2019 the TurboGrafx-16 Mini, a dedicated console featuring many built-in games. On March 6, 2020, Konami announced that the TurboGrafx-16 Mini and its peripheral accessories would be delayed indefinitely from its previous March 19, 2020 launch date due to the COVID-19 pandemic disrupting supply chains in China. It was released in North America on May 22, 2020, and released in Europe on June 5, 2020.
