= Hudson Soft HuC6280 =

8-bit microprocessor

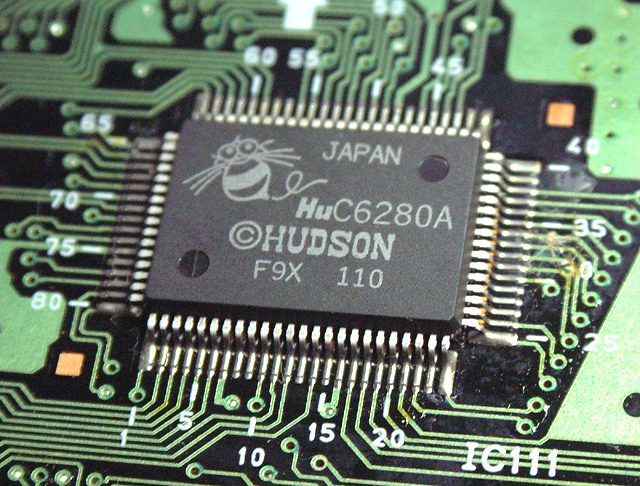
Revised HuC6280A

The HuC6280 8-bit microprocessor is Japanese company Hudson Soft's improved version of the WDC 65C02 CPU, an upgraded CMOS version of the popular NMOS-based MOS Technology 6502 8-bit CPU, manufactured for Hudson by Seiko Epson and NEC. The most notable product using the HuC6280 is NEC's TurboGrafx-16 video game console.

== Description ==
The HuC6280 contains a 65C02 core which has several additional instructions and a few internal peripheral functions such as an interrupt controller, a memory management unit, a timer, an 8-bit parallel I/O port, and a programmable sound generator (PSG). The processor operates at two speeds, 1.79 MHz and 7.16 MHz.

A slightly revised HuC6280A was released and used in the PC Engine CoreGrafx and SuperGrafx. This revision reportedly fixed some minor audio issues in those systems.

== Memory mapping ==
The HuC6280 has a 64 KB logical address space, but a 2 MB physical address space. The HuC6280 uses a memory management unit that splits the memory space into segments of 8 KB. Each logical 8 KB segment is associated with one of 256 physical 8 KB sized segments. This can be set up with an 8-bit register (MPR0-7) that contains the most significant eight bits of the address of the 8 KB segment in physical memory. Thus the logical 64 KB address space can be overlapping, continuous or scattered in physical address space, depending on the eight MPR registers.

Two special instructions are used to access these registers:

TAMi - transfer the content of the accumulator (A) into an MPR register (0-7).

TMAi - transfer an MPR register into the accumulator.

== Sound generator ==
PSG-styled wavetable synthesis provides six sound channels, which can be conveniently paired according to the functionality they provide:

       0-1 - Waveform playback
             Frequency modulation (channel 1 muted)
       2-3 - Waveform playback only
       4-5 - Waveform playback
             White noise generation

Waveform playback is the most common and allows a 32-byte, 5-bit unsigned linear sample to be played back at selected frequencies. Frequency modulation takes this one step further, allowing the playback frequency to be dynamically adjusted according to a specified pattern. White noise is used to simulate percussion instruments and effects, such as explosions, by means of a pseudo-random square wave.

Alternatively, each channel can be individually switched to "Direct D/A" mode in which the programmer can send data directly to the sound mixer, allowing more complex sound patterns to be generated, such as speech. Inevitably, this requires more programming effort and CPU time.
