= HuCard =

ROM cartridge for the TurboGrafx-16

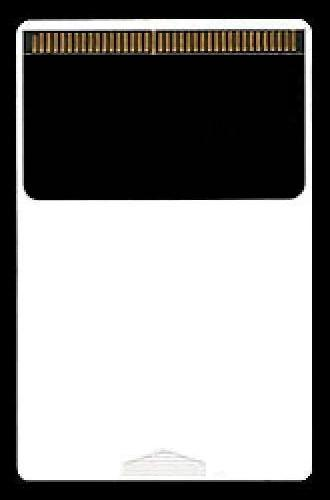
A HuCard

The HuCard (Japanese: ヒューカード, Hepburn: HyūKādo) (known as the TurboChip in regions where the PC Engine was marketed as the TurboGrafx-16) is a ROM cartridge in the form of a card, designed by Hudson Soft for NEC's PC Engine and PC Engine SuperGrafx video game consoles, which were originally released in 1987 and 1989, respectively.

== Development ==
The HuCard is an evolution from an earlier Hudson Soft technology, the Bee Card, which it developed in the early 1980s as a distribution medium for MSX software. The Bee Card is an EEPROM device that is slightly thinner than the HuCard. It has 32 connectors whereas the HuCard has 38.

In July 1985, Hudson approached and pitched Nintendo a new add-on for the Famicom that played games using the patented Bee Cards. Nintendo liked this concept, as it had the ability to store full games and overwrite existing ones. However, as the technology for it was expensive, and that they would have to pay royalties for each card sold, Nintendo decided to pass on Hudson's proposal and would go on to develop the Famicom Disk System instead.

Hudson next approached NEC, who would end up partnering with Hudson to use the HuCard on its consoles.

Most video game cartridges have a large plastic housing to protect the PCB while providing enough space inside for radiant heat and, in some cases, a button cell battery. The PCB in a HuCard or Bee Card is protected by a rigid, glossy polymer that conducts heat; since one side of the card is left partially exposed while inserted in the console, heat disperses with less obstruction.

== Releases ==
Video game developers made new releases on HuCard until December 1994, when 21 Emon: Mezase! Hotel Ō was released in Japan for the PC Engine. It was the last official release for the platform in any region.

Hudson Soft, NEC, and other vendors published seven HuCard games specifically for the PC Engine SuperGrafx. Hudson Soft called this enhanced medium the Super HuCard.

Atlantean, an independent game released on a HuCard, was made available in August 2014. Jessie Jaeger in Cleopatra's Curse is a new title in development with a planned release in 2022.

== See also ==
- Family Computer Network System – Peripheral for the Family Computer
- Sega Card – Memory cards used for game storage
- Bee Card (game cartridge)
- Nintendo game card – Game cartridge used on some Nintendo video game consoles
- Astron SoftCard
