= Keith Courage in Alpha Zones =

1988 video game

- North American box art
- Developer: Advance Communication Company
- Publishers: JP: Hudson Soft; NA: NEC
- Programmer: Chudon Okawari
- Composers: Michiharu Hasuya; Osamu Kasai; Masaaki Harada
- Platform: PC Engine/TurboGrafx-16
- Release: JP: August 30, 1988; NA: August 29, 1989
- Genre: Platform
- Mode: Single-player

Keith Courage in Alpha Zones is a 1989 platform game released by NEC for the TurboGrafx-16. It was the pack-in game for the console in North America. It was originally released in Japan by Hudson Soft on August 30, 1988, for the PC Engine (The TG-16's Japanese counterpart), under the title Mashin Hero Wataru (Japanese: 魔神英雄伝ワタル, Hepburn: Mashin Eiyūden Wataru) which is adapted from the anime television series of the same name. Hudson later released in 1990 another game for the Famicom based on the franchise titled Mashin Eiyuuden Wataru Gaiden Famicom, which is a role-playing video game.

== Plot ==
The player controls Keith Courage. In this game, Earth has been struck by a giant meteor, carrying an invasion force from another planet. Burrowing deep within the planet's surface, the planet of B.A.D. (Beastly Alien Dudes) seeks to take over the Earth. As a member of N.I.C.E. (Nations of International Citizens for Earth), Keith's mission is to defeat B.A.D. and bring peace to the world. Armed with a sword, Keith must first defeat the outpost guards. Then, enter the Underworld. Here Keith activates the awesome Nova Suit. A secret force left to him by his fallen father, he is half man, half mechanical monster. Nearly invincible, his sword cracks with the power of lightning, as you wreak havoc on the fearsome Dudes. His goal is to reach the Robo Zone (the seventh Alpha Zone), headquarters of B.A.D. Succeed here and the player will win the game, recapturing the Earth and restoring humanity's place in the universe. Four friends offer Keith advice, swords, bombs, and extra lives. The player's goal is to collect the stolen riches left behind by the invaders and buy your way out of trouble with money.

== Gameplay ==
The game is an action-adventure platform game, with two styles of play depending on whether the player is above (overworld) or below ground (underworld). There are a total of seven levels in the game, each of which is broken into two areas, the overworld and underworld. Overworld areas consist of simple rightward travel and platform hopping. In the overworld, one controls Keith Courage in his human form, using a dagger to fend off enemies which take the form of birds, moles, and even cats that drop from the sky. Upon reaching the end of the overworld level, Keith is transported via rainbow to the underworld, whereupon he adopts the Nova Suit. The underworld levels are more complex and menacing than the colorful overworld, with aggressive nightmare creatures and a larger landscape to travel with more of a focus on navigating not only horizontally but also vertically. At the end of each underworld level is a boss. In the overworld, the player can go into buildings at times and buy power ups.

=== Overworld gameplay ===
In the overworld, Keith is a simple adventurous human with a short sword and three heart containers. The overworld, while simple, is where Keith will collect coins and spend those coins to obtain "bolt bombs," health regeneration, and better equipment for the underworld by going to houses that have NPCs to talk to.

=== Underworld gameplay ===
Transporting to the underworld places Keith in the Nova Suit, a suit of armor that grants him extra hearts on his health bar and a better sword depending on what was purchased in the overworld. Additionally, Keith is now able to use the "bolt bombs." When used, bolt bombs are similar to bullets that are fired in the eight cardinal directions depending on how many are left.

== Reception ==
Reception

Review scores
Publication	Score
AllGame	2/5
Aktueller Software Markt	5/12
Computer and Video Games	78%
IGN	5.5/10
Tilt	15/20
Joystick (DE)	6.5/10
Micro News	4/5

Keith Courage in Alpha Zones garnered mixed reviews from critics.
