= Fourth generation of video game consoles =

Gaming generation from 1987 to 2004

In the history of video games, the fourth generation of video game consoles, more commonly referred to as the 16-bit era, began on October 30, 1987, with the Japanese release of NEC Home Electronics' PC Engine (known as the TurboGrafx-16 in North America). Though NEC released the first console of this era, sales were mostly dominated by the rivalry between Sega and Nintendo across most markets: the Mega Drive (known as the Genesis in North America) and the Super Nintendo Entertainment System (known as the Super Famicom in Japan). Cartridge-based handheld game consoles became prominent during this time, such as the Game Boy, Lynx, Game Gear, and TurboExpress.

Nintendo was able to capitalize on its success in the third generation, and managed to win the largest worldwide market share in the fourth generation as well. However, particularly in the lucrative North American market, there was a fierce console war in the early 1990s, which eventually saw Sega taking a market share lead over Nintendo in North America by 1993. Sega's success in this era stemmed largely from its launch of its popular Sonic the Hedgehog franchise to compete with Nintendo's Super Mario series, as well as a very stylized marketing campaign aimed at American teenagers. Several other companies released consoles in this generation, but none of them were widely successful. Nevertheless, there were other companies that started to take notice of the maturing video game industry and began making plans to release consoles of their own in the future. As with prior generations, game media still continued to be distributed primarily on ROM cartridges, though the first optical disc systems, such as the Philips CD-i, were released to limited success. There was additionally competition with games on home computers such as the Amiga, Atari ST, Apple IIGS, Mac, FM Towns, IBM PC compatibles, and X68000. As games became more complex, concerns over violence in games like Mortal Kombat and Night Trap led to the creation of the Entertainment Software Rating Board.

The emergence of fifth generation video game consoles, beginning around 1994, did not initially significantly diminish the popularity of fourth generation consoles. In 1996, however, there was a major drop in sales of hardware from this generation and a dwindling number of software publishers supporting its systems, which together led to a drop in software sales in subsequent years.

The fourth generation of video game consoles ended when the last official game of the generation, Samurai Shodown V Special, was released worldwide on July 15, 2004 for the discontinued SNK Neo Geo.

== Differences from third generation consoles ==
Features that distinguish some fourth generation consoles from third generation consoles include:

- 16-bit microprocessors
- Multi-button game controllers with many buttons (3 to 8)
- Parallax scrolling of multi-layer tilemap backgrounds
- Large sprites (up to 64×64 or 16×512 pixels), 80–380 sprites on screen, 16–96 sprites per scan line
- Elaborate color, 64 to 4096 colors on screen, from palettes of 512 (9-bit) to 65,536 (16-bit) colors
- Stereo audio, with multiple channels and digital audio playback (PCM, ADPCM)
- Advanced music synthesis (FM, wavetable and/or sample-based synthesis)

Additionally, in specific cases, fourth generation hardware featured:

- Backgrounds with pseudo-3D scaling and rotation
- Sprites that can individually be scaled and rotated
- Flat-shaded 3D polygon graphics
- Surround sound support
- CD-ROM support via add-ons, allowing larger storage space, full motion video playback, and streaming CD-DA audio playback

== Home systems ==
=== TurboGrafx-16 ===
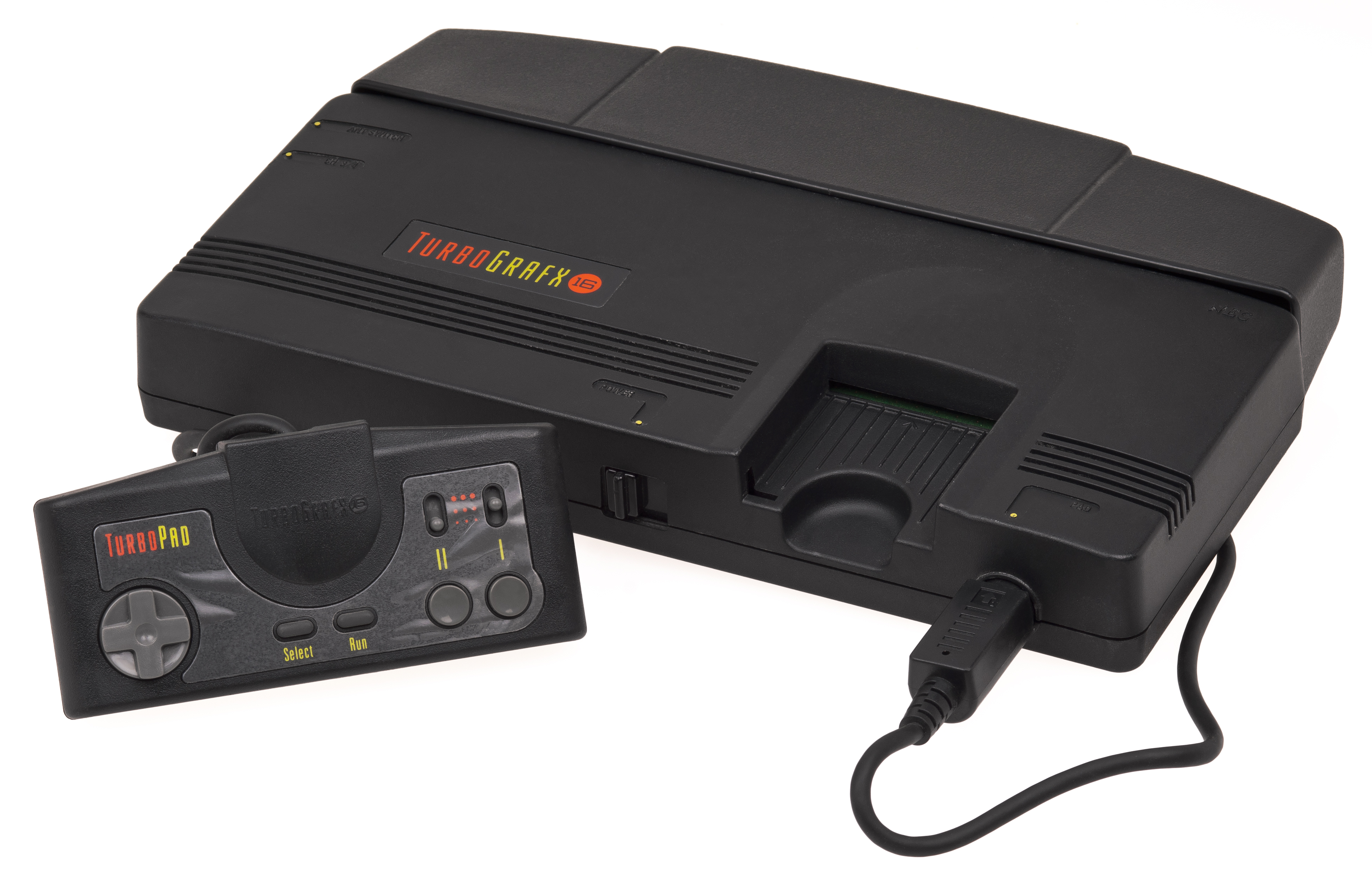
TurboGrafx-16

The PC Engine was the result of a collaboration between Hudson Soft and NEC and launched in Japan on October 30, 1987. It launched under the name TurboGrafx-16 in North America on August 29, 1989.

Initially, the PC Engine was quite successful in Japan, partly due to titles available on the then-new CD-ROM format. NEC released a CD add-on in 1990 and by 1992 had released a combination TurboGrafx and CD-ROM system known as the TurboDuo.

In the United States, NEC used Bonk, a head-banging caveman, as their mascot and featured him in most of the TurboGrafx advertising from 1990 to 1994. The platform was well received initially, especially in larger markets, but failed to make inroads into the smaller metropolitan areas where NEC did not have as many store representatives or as focused in-store promotion.

The TurboGrafx-16 failed to maintain its sales momentum or to make a strong impact in North America. The TurboGrafx-16 and its CD combination system, the Turbo Duo, ceased manufacturing in North America by 1994, though a small amount of software continued to trickle out for the platform.

=== Mega Drive/Genesis ===
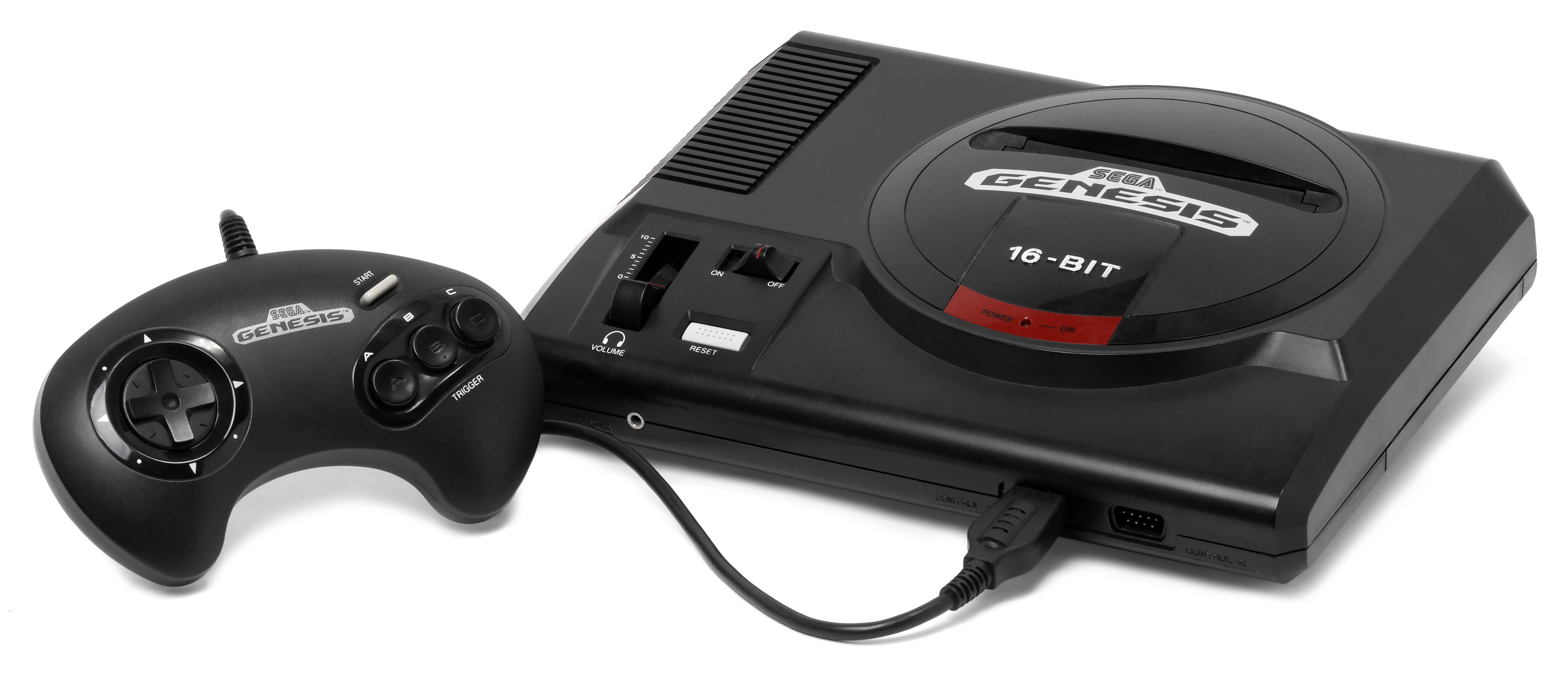
First version of the Sega Genesis

The Mega Drive was released in Japan on October 29, 1988. The console was released in New York City and Los Angeles on August 14, 1989, under the name Sega Genesis, and in the rest of North America later that year. It was launched in Europe and Australia on November 30, 1990, under its original name.

Sega built its marketing campaign around its new mascot Sonic the Hedgehog, pushing the Genesis as the "cooler" alternative to Nintendo's console and inventing the term "Blast Processing" to suggest that the Genesis was capable of handling games with faster motion than the SNES. Their advertising was often directly adversarial, leading to commercials such as "Genesis does what Nintendon't" and the "SEGA!" scream.

When the arcade game Mortal Kombat was ported for home release on the Genesis and Super Nintendo Entertainment System, Nintendo decided to censor the game's gore, but Sega kept the content in the game, via a code entered at the start screen. Sega's version of Mortal Kombat received generally more favorable reviews in the gaming press and outsold the SNES version three to one. This also led to Congressional hearings to investigate the marketing of violent video games to children, and to the creation of the Interactive Digital Software Association and the Entertainment Software Rating Board. Sega concluded that the superior sales of their version of Mortal Kombat were outweighed by the resulting loss in consumer trust, and cancelled the game's release in Spain to avoid further controversy. With the new ESRB rating system in place, Nintendo reconsidered its position for the release of Mortal Kombat II, and this time became the preferred version among reviewers.

The console was never popular in Japan (being regularly outsold by the PC Engine), but still managed to sell 30.75 million units worldwide. By late 1995, Sega was supporting five different consoles and two add-ons, and Sega Enterprises chose to discontinue the Mega Drive in Japan to concentrate on the new Sega Saturn. While this made perfect sense for the Japanese market, it was disastrous in North America: the market for Genesis games was much larger than for the Saturn, but Sega was left without the inventory or software to meet demand.

=== Super NES ===
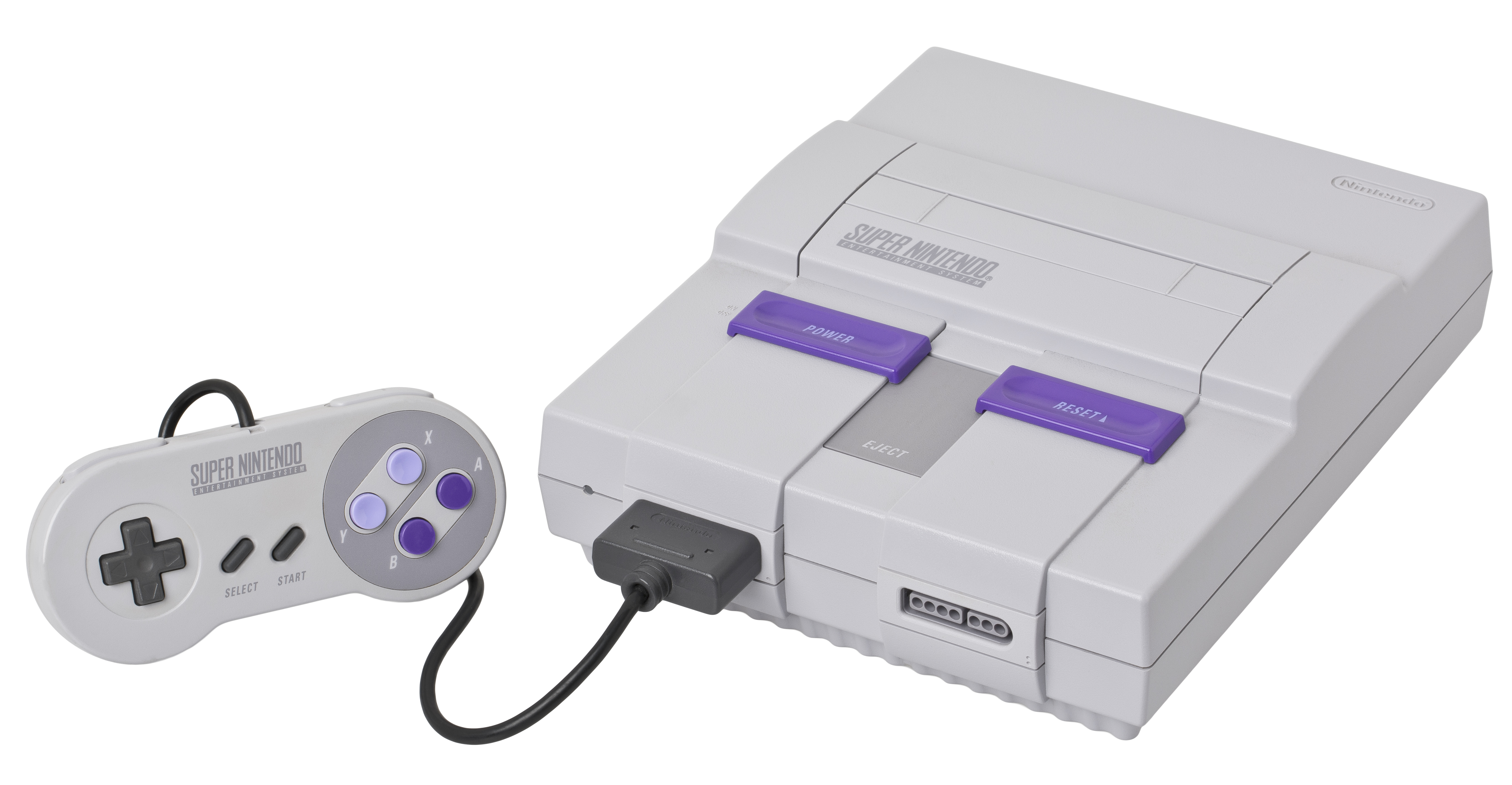
The North American version of the Super NES

Nintendo's fourth-generation console, the Super Famicom, was released in Japan on November 21, 1990; Nintendo's initial shipment of 300,000 units sold out within hours. The machine reached North America as the Super Nintendo Entertainment System on August 23, 1991, (Note: According to Stephen Kent's The Ultimate History of Video Games, the official launch date was September 9. Newspaper and magazine articles from late 1991 report that the first shipments were in stores in some regions on August 23, while it arrived in other regions at a later date. Many modern online sources (circa 2005 and later) report August 13.) and Europe and Australia in April 1992.

Despite stiff competition from the Mega Drive/Genesis console, the Super NES eventually took the top selling position, selling 49.10 million units worldwide, and would remain popular well into the fifth generation of consoles. Nintendo's market position was defined by its machine's increased video and sound capabilities, including exclusive first-party franchise titles such as F-Zero, Super Mario World, Star Fox, Super Mario Kart, Donkey Kong Country, The Legend of Zelda: A Link to the Past and Super Metroid.

=== Compact Disc Interactive (CD-i) ===
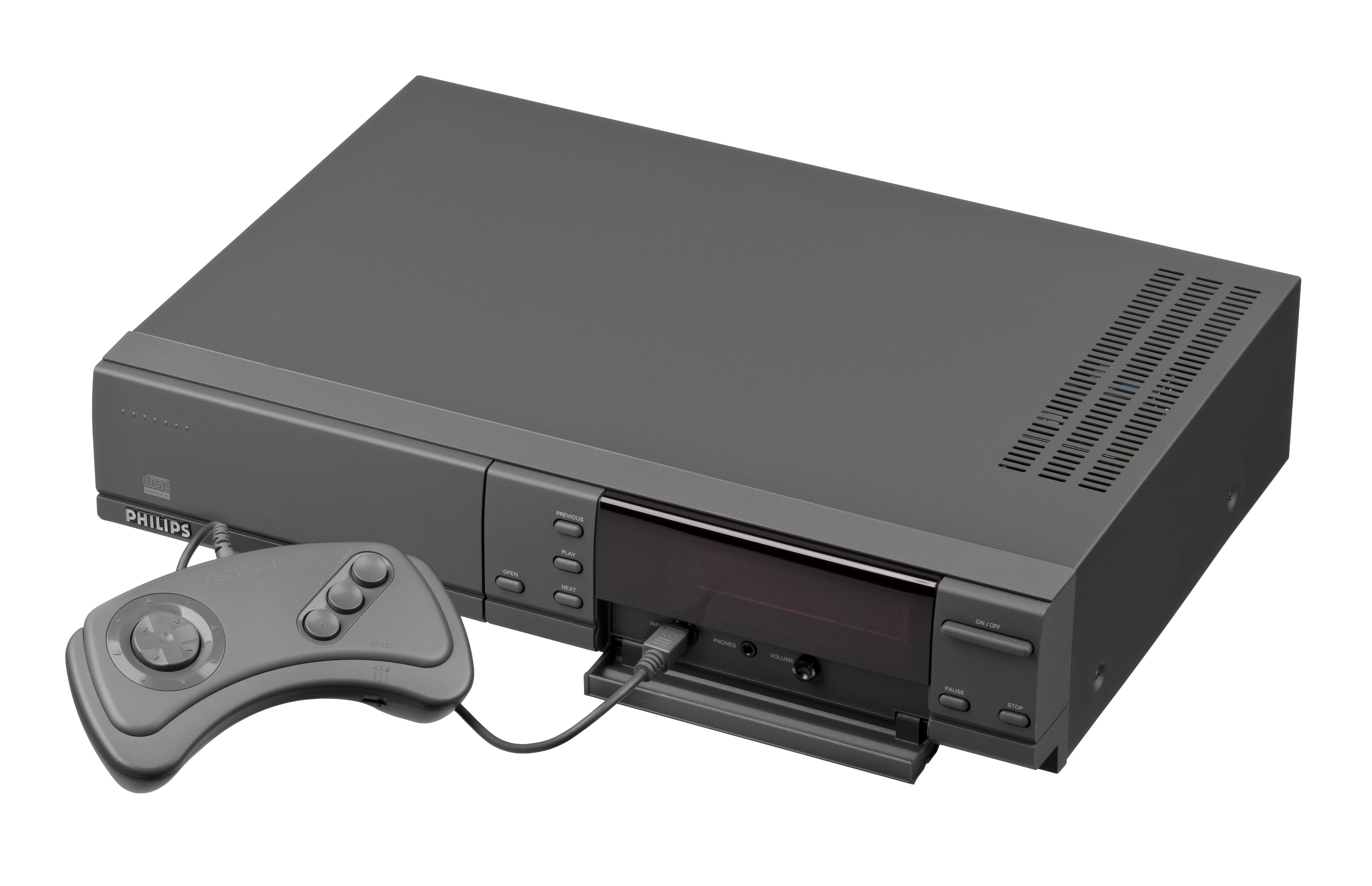
Philips CD-i

The CD-i format was announced in the late 1980s, with the first machines compatible with the format being released in 1991. The Philips CD-i's main selling point was that it was more than a game machine and could be used for multimedia needs. Due to an agreement between Nintendo and Philips about an abortive CD add-on for the SNES (which eventually evolved into Sony's PlayStation), Philips also had rights to use some of Nintendo's franchises. The CD-i was a commercial failure and was discontinued in 1998, selling only 1 million units worldwide despite several partnerships and multiple versions of the device, some made by other manufacturers.

=== Neo Geo ===
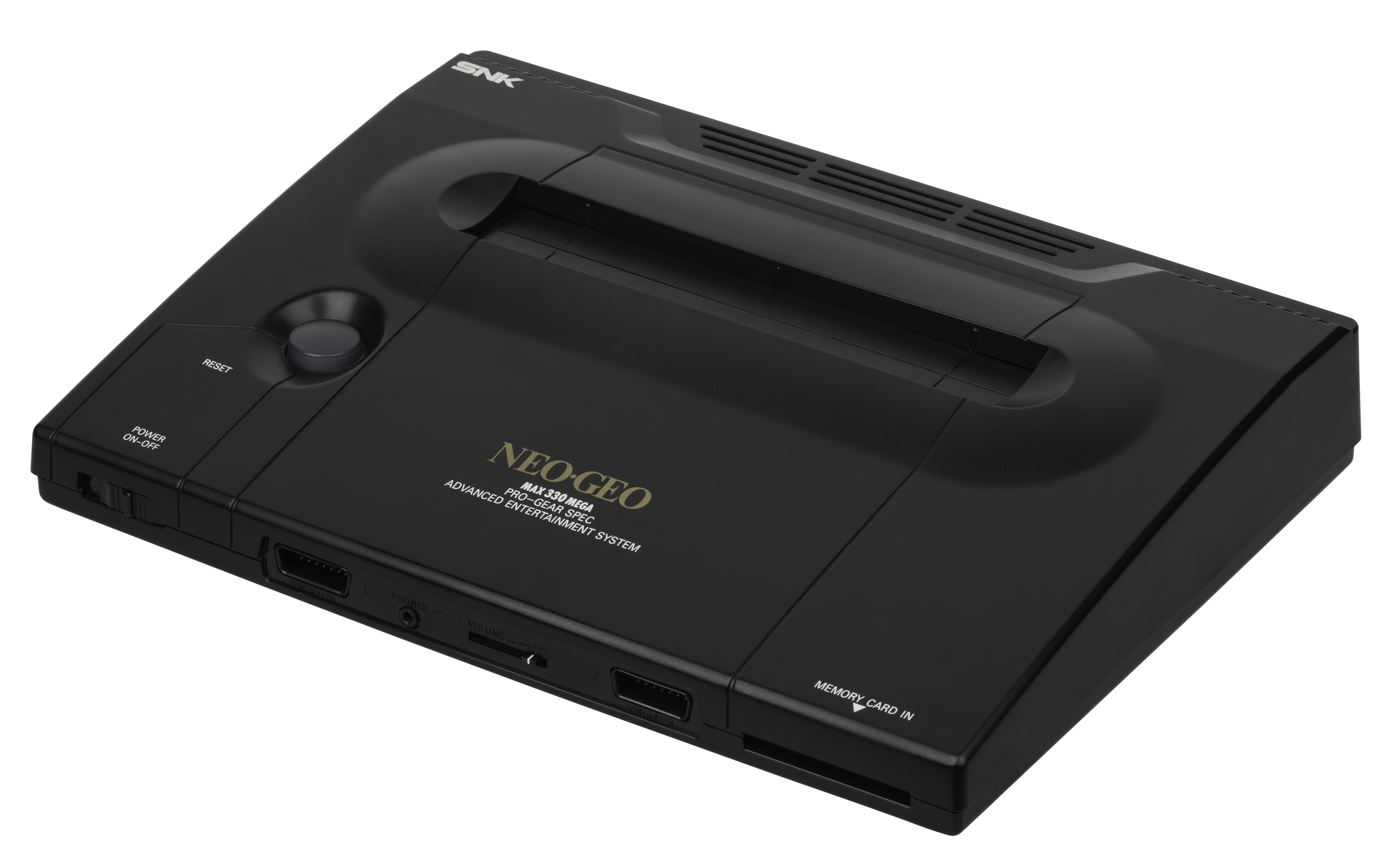
Neo-Geo

Released by SNK in 1990, the Neo Geo was a home console version of the major arcade platform. Compared to its console competition, the Neo Geo had much better graphics and sound, however, the prohibitively expensive launch price of $649.99 and games often retailing at over $250 made the console only accessible to a niche market. A less expensive version, retailing for $399.99, did not include a memory card, pack-in game or extra joystick.

=== Add-ons ===
Nintendo, NEC and Sega also competed with hardware peripherals for their consoles in this generation. NEC was the first with the release of the TurboGrafx CD system in 1990. Retailing for $399.99 at release, the CD add-on was not a popular purchase, but was largely responsible for the platform's success in Japan. The Sega CD was released with an unusually high price tag ($300 at its release) and a limited library of games. A unique add-on for the Sega console was Sega Channel, a subscription-based service (a form of online gaming delivery) hosted by local television providers. It required hardware that plugged into a cable line and the Genesis.

Nintendo also made two attempts with the Satellaview and the Super Game Boy. The Satellaview was a satellite service released only in Japan and the Super Game Boy was an adapter for the SNES that allowed Game Boy games to be displayed on a TV in color. Nintendo, working along with Sony, also had plans to create a CD-ROM drive for the SNES (plans that resulted in a prototype version of the Sony PlayStation), but eventually decided not to go through with that project, opting to team up with Philips in the development of the add-on instead (contrary to popular belief, the CD-i was largely unrelated to the project).

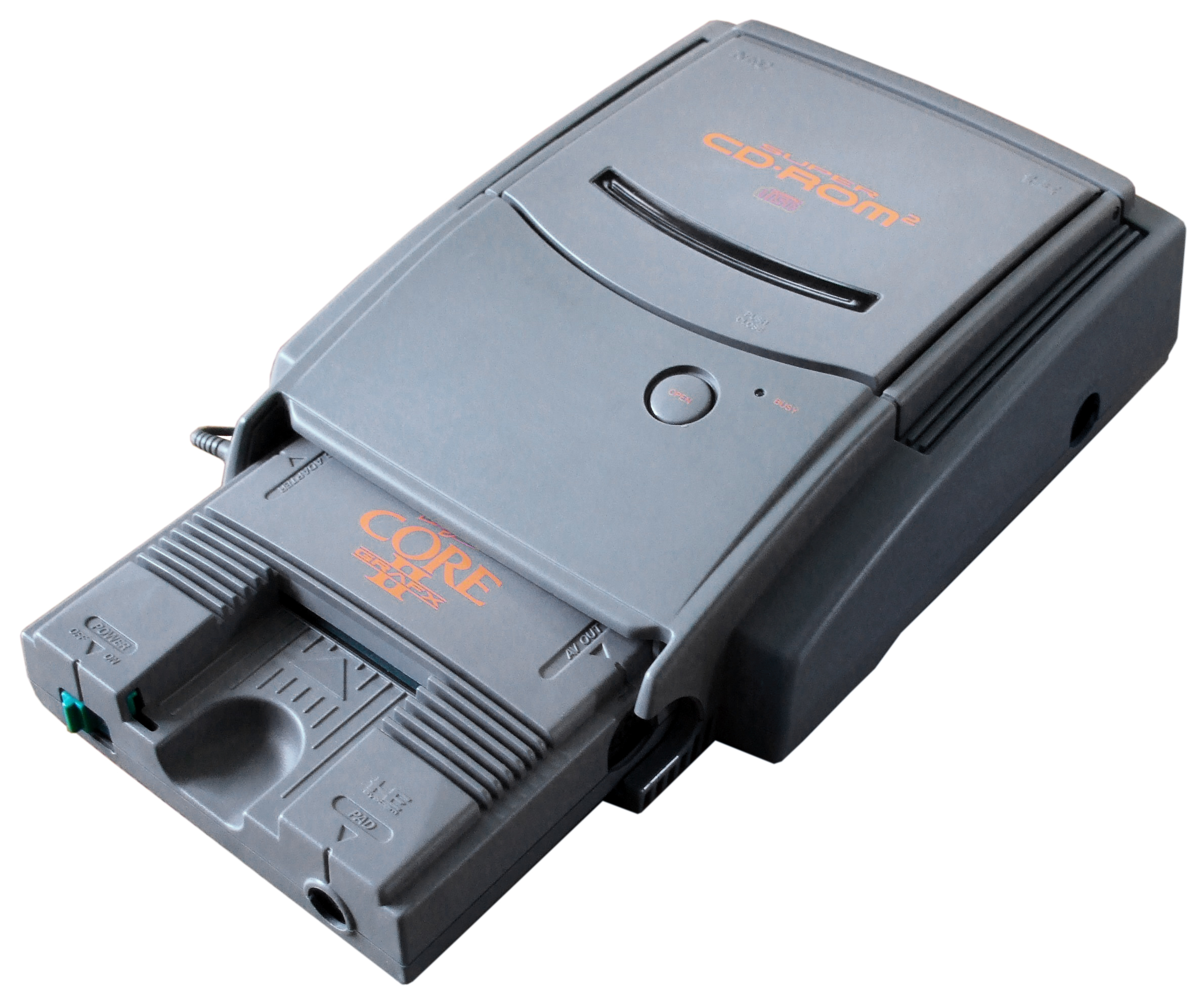
PC Engine CoreGrafx II with Super CD-ROM^{2}

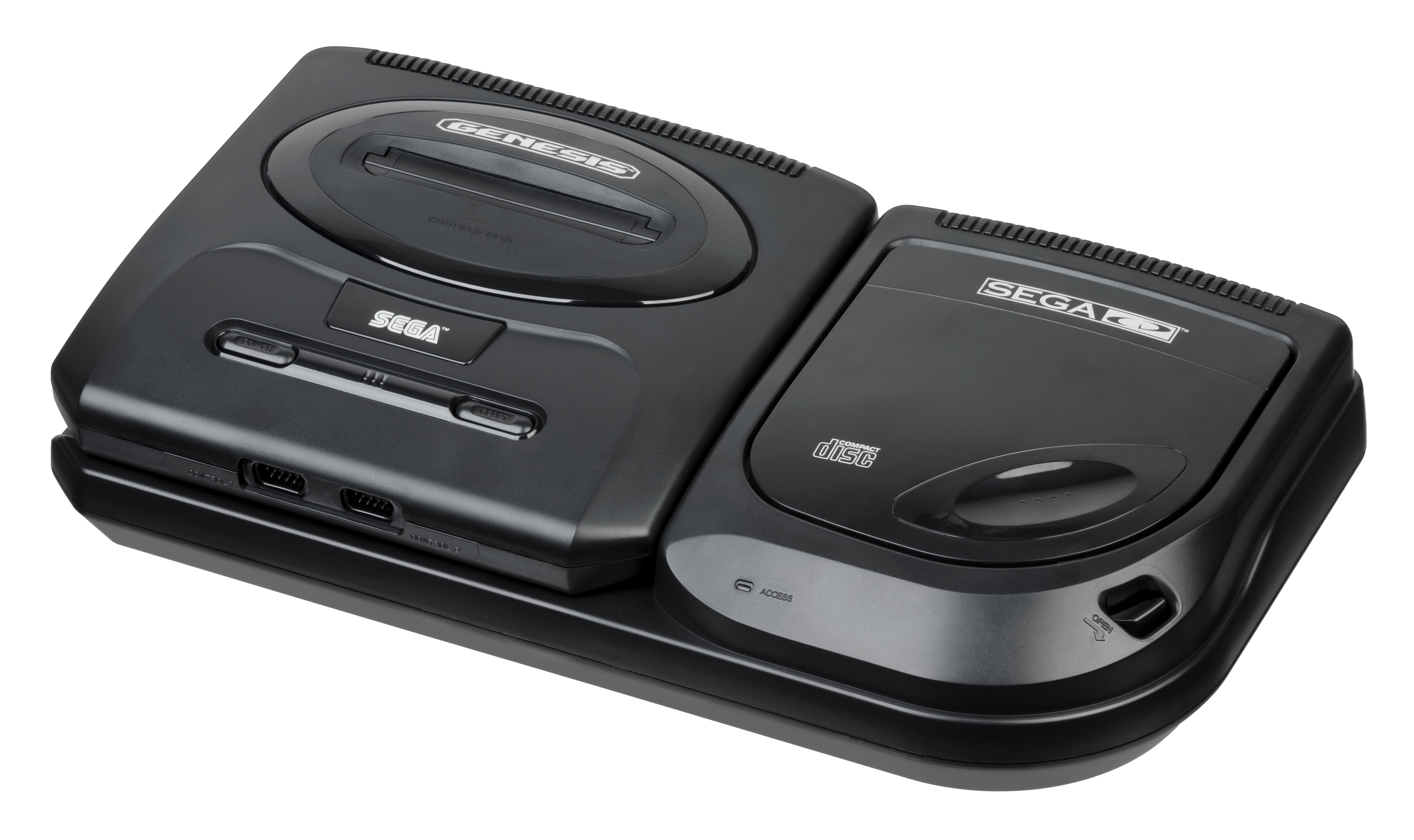
Second model Genesis and Sega CD

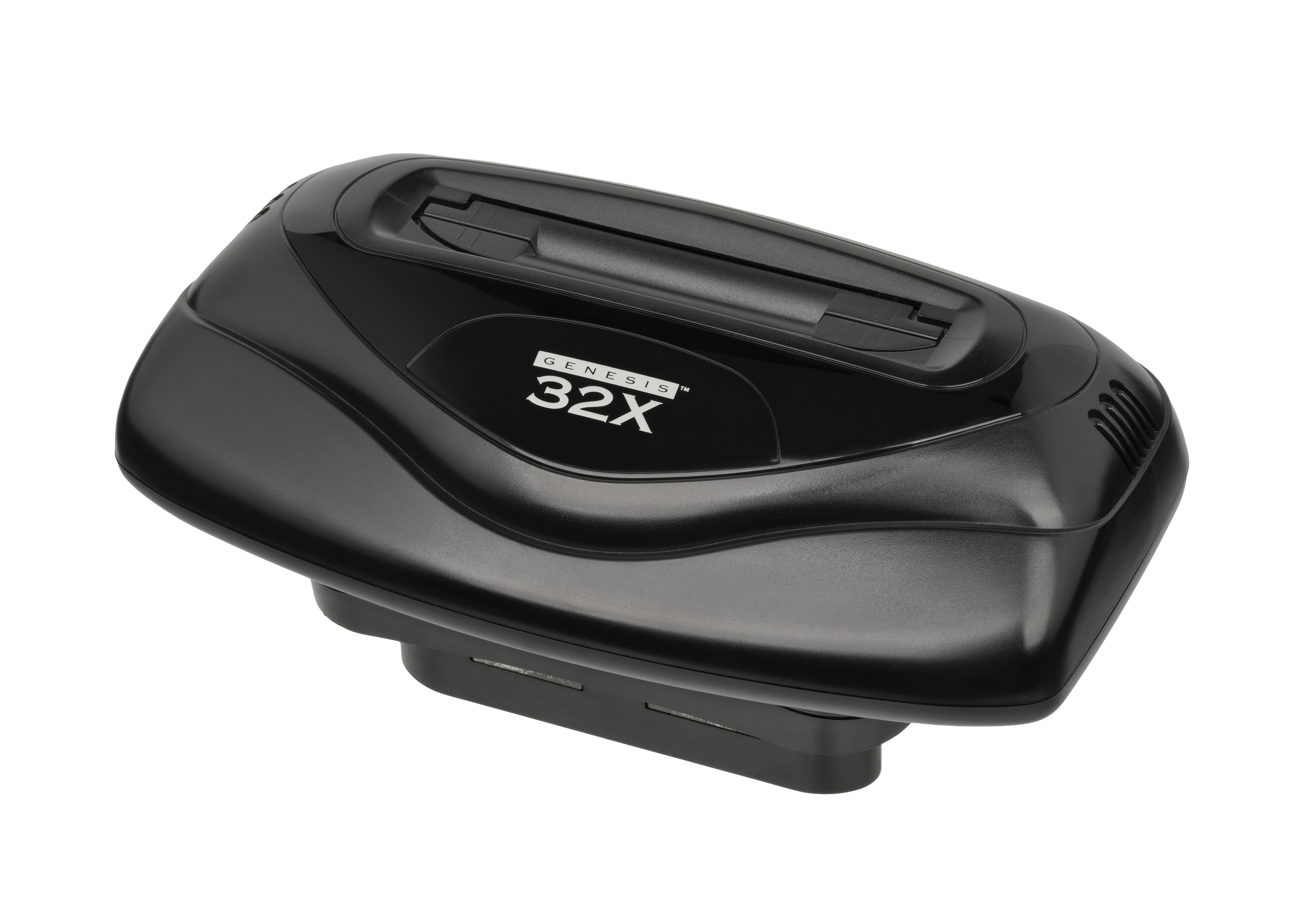
32X

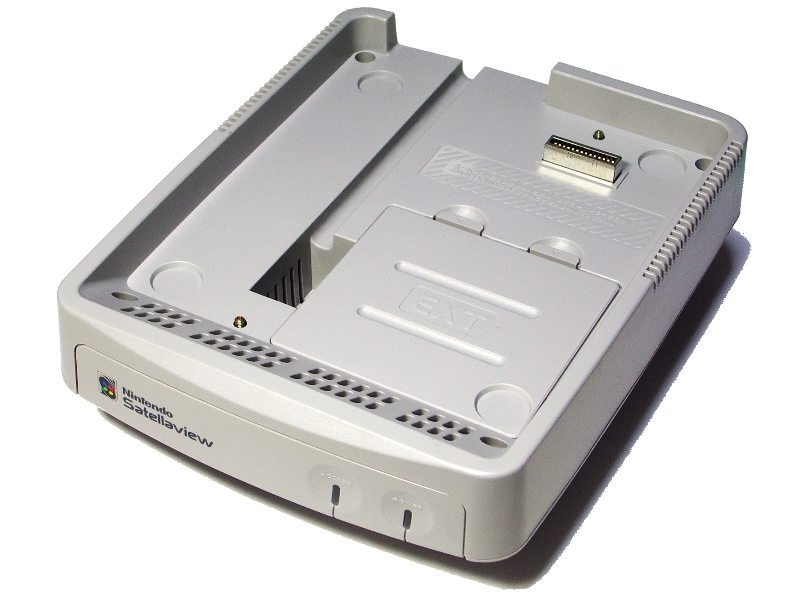
Satellaview

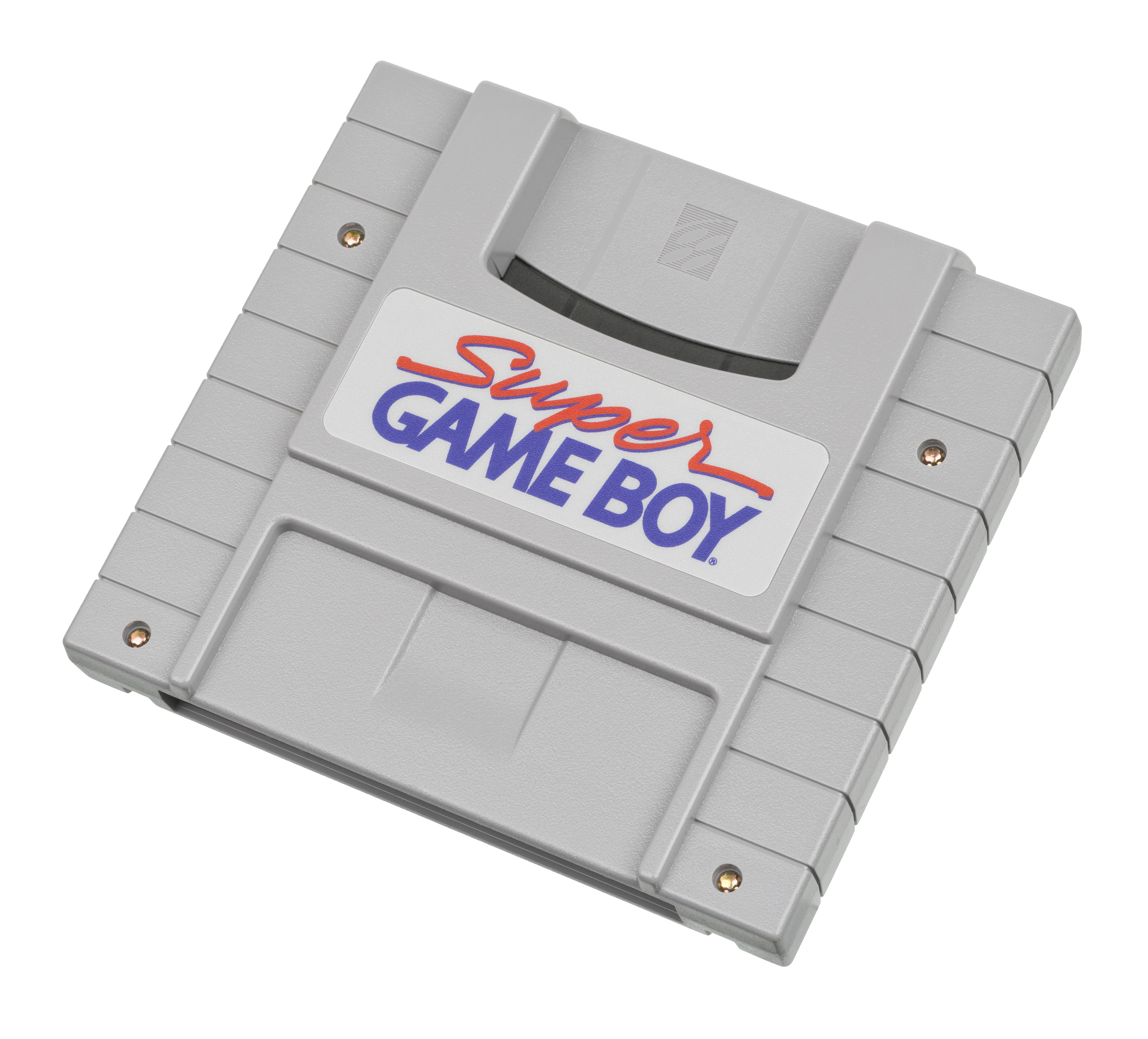
Super Game Boy

=== European importing ===
NTSC PAL, or switching to PAL SECAM No information

The fourth generation was also the era when the act of buying imported US games became more established in Europe, and regular stores began to carry them. The PAL region has a refresh rate of 50 Hz (compared with 60 Hz for NTSC) and a vertical resolution of 625 interlaced lines (576 effective), compared with 525/480 for NTSC. Because the simulation speed of contemporary game systems was directly linked to the output frame rate, which was in turn synchronized with the TV's refresh rate, this meant that the game would run more slowly on a PAL television. The smaller number of vertical lines in the NTSC signal would also lead to black bars appearing on the top and bottom of a PAL television. Developers often had a hard time converting games designed for the American and Japanese NTSC standard to the European and Australian PAL standard. Companies such as Konami, with large budgets and a healthy following in Europe and Australia, readily optimized several games (such as the International Superstar Soccer series) for this audience, while most smaller developers did not.

Also, few RPGs were released in Europe because the market for the genre was not as large as in Japan or North America, and the increasing amount of time and money required for translation as RPGs became more text-heavy, in addition to the usual need to convert the games to the PAL standard, often made localizing the games to Europe a high-cost venture with little potential payoff. As a result, RPG releases in Europe were largely limited to games which had previously been localized for North America, thus reducing the amount of translation required.

Popular US games imported at this time included Final Fantasy IV (known in the US as Final Fantasy II), Final Fantasy VI (known in the US as Final Fantasy III), Secret of Mana, Street Fighter II, Chrono Trigger, and Super Mario RPG. Secret of Mana and Street Fighter II would eventually receive official release in Europe, whilst Final Fantasy IV, Final Fantasy VI, Chrono Trigger and Super Mario RPG would be released in Europe years later on other consoles or formats outside of this generation.

=== Comparison ===
Comparison of fourth-generation video game home consoles
Name		PC-Engine/ TurboGrafx-16	Mega Drive/ Genesis	Super Famicom/ Super NES	Neo Geo
Logo					
Manufacturer		NEC	Sega	Nintendo	SNK
Image(s)					
Release date		JP: October 30, 1987; NA: August 29, 1989; EU: 1990	JP: October 29, 1988; NA: August 14, 1989; EU: November 30, 1990	JP: November 21, 1990; NA: August 23, 1991; EU: April 11, 1992	JP/NA: June 18, 1991; EU: 1991
Launch prices	US$	US$199.99 (equivalent to $520 in 2025)	US$189.99 (equivalent to $490 in 2025)	US$199.99 (equivalent to $470 in 2025)	US$649.99 (Gold version) (equivalent to $1,540 in 2025) US$399.99 (Silver version) (equivalent to $950 in 2025)
Launch prices	GBP		£189.99 (equivalent to $470 in 2025)	£150 (equivalent to $330 in 2025)	
Launch prices	JP¥	¥59,800 (equivalent to ¥65,970 in 2024)	¥21,000 (equivalent to ¥26,780 in 2024)	¥25,000 (equivalent to ¥30,260 in 2024)	
Media	Type	HuCard (card-shaped cartridge); CD-ROM (Turbo CD add-on)	Cartridge; CD-ROM (Sega CD add-on); Data card (Power Base Converter add-on)	Game Pak (Cartridge)	Cartridge; Data card (Japan/Europe); CD-ROM (Neo Geo CD)
Media	Regional lockout	Partial	Region locked	Region locked	Unrestricted
Media	Backward compatibility	—N/a	Master System (using Power Base Converter)	Nintendo Entertainment System (unlicensed, using Super 8) Game Boy (using Super Game Boy)	—N/a
Pack-in game		Keith Courage in Alpha Zones	Sonic the Hedgehog (15 million)	Super Mario World (20.6 million)	—N/a
Best-selling games		Bonk's Adventure	Sonic the Hedgehog 2 (6 million)	Street Fighter II: The World Warrior (6.3 million)	Samurai Shodown
Accessories (retail)		TurboGrafx-CD (1988); System Card (1988); Super System Card (1991); Arcade Card (1994); TurboTap (1987); TurboStick; TurboBooster; TurboBooster Plus	Mega CD/Sega CD (1991); Sega CD Backup Ram carts (1992 JP) (1994 NA); Sega 32X (1994); Mouse; Menacer (1992); Power Base Converter; Sega Activator (1993); Multitap	Super Scope; Super NES Mouse (1992); Super Multitap (1993); Super Game Boy (1994); Super Advantage; Satellaview (1995)	Neo Geo Controller Pro (1995); Neo Geo Memory Card (1990); Neo Geo MVS to AES Converter (1998)
CPU		Hudson Soft HuC6280A (based on 8-bit 65SC02); 1.79 MHz (0.77 MIPS) or 7.16 MHz (3.08 MIPS)	Motorola 68000 (16/32-bit CISC) 7.67 MHz (7.61 MHz PAL) (1.4 MIPS) (12.5 MHz CD) (2.19 MIPS); Zilog Z80 (8/16-bit) 3.58 MHz (0.52 MIPS) (Note: Mega Drive games use the Z80 as a sound controller. The Power Base Converter effectively turns the Mega Drive into a Master System, giving control to the Z80 and leaving the 68000 dormant.); 32X add-on: 2× Hitachi SH-2 (32-bit RISC) @ 23 MHz (60 MIPS)	Nintendo custom Ricoh 5A22 (based on 16-bit 65C816) 3.58 MHz (3.55 MHz PAL) (1.5 MIPS); SA-1 enhancement chip: Nintendo custom 65C816 10.74 MHz (4.5 MIPS)	Motorola 68000 (16/32-bit CISC) 12 MHz (2.1 MIPS); Zilog Z80 (8/16-bit) 4 MHz (0.58 MIPS)
GPU		Hudson Soft HuC6260 Video Color Encoder (16-bit); Hudson Soft HuC6270A Video Display Controller (16-bit)	Yamaha YM7101 VDP (Video Display Processor); Upgrades: SVP chip: Samsung SSP1601 DSP @ 23 MHz (25 MIPS) (1994); CD add-on: Sega ASIC coprocessor; 32X add-on: Sega 32x VDP (Sega Custom LSI) @ 23 MHz	Ricoh PPU1 (Picture Processing Unit 1); Ricoh PPU2 (Picture Processing Unit 2); Enhancement chips: DSP: NEC μPD77C25 @ 8 MHz (1990); Super FX: 10.5 MHz (10 MIPS) (1993); Capcom Cx4 (Hitachi HG51B169 DSP) (1994); Super FX 2: 21.477 MHz (21 MIPS) (1995)	SNK LSPC2-A2 (line sprite generator & VRAM interface); SNK PRO-B0 (palette arbiter)
Sound chip(s)		Hudson Soft HuC6280A PSG; CD add-on: Oki MSM5205	Yamaha YM2612; Yamaha VDP PSG (SN76496); Upgrades: CD add-on: Ricoh RF5c164; 32X add-on: Pulse-code modulation	Sony APU (Audio Processing Unit): S-SMP (8-bit Sony SPC700); S-DSP (16-bit DSP)	Yamaha YM2610
RAM		8 KB main RAM; 64 KB video RAM; Upgrades: Super System Card: 64 KB DRAM, 192 KB SRAM; Arcade Duo Card: 2048 KB FPM DRAM, 192 KB SRAM; Arcade Pro Card: 2240 KB+192 kB	64 KB main PSRAM; 64 KB video DRAM; 8 KB Z80/audio SRAM; Upgrades: SVP chip: 128 KB DRAM, 2 KB cache, 1 KB DSP RAM; CD add-on: 512 KB main, 256 KB Video, 64 KB Audio, 16 KB cache, 8 KB Internal Back-up; CD BackUp Ram Carts: 8 KB to 512 KB; 32X add-on: 256 KB main RAM, 256 KB video RAM	128 KB main DRAM; 64 KB video SRAM; 64 KB audio PSRAM; Enhancement chips: SA-1: 2 KB RAM; Super FX: 32 to 128 KB SRAM; Super FX 2: 64 to 128 KB SRAM	64 KB main SRAM; 74 KB video SRAM; 2 KB audio SRAM
Video		Resolution: 256×224 to 565×242 (progressive), 256×448 to 565×484 (interlaced); Sprites: 64 on screen, 16 per scanline, 16×16 to 32×64 sizes, 16 colors per sprite, sprite flipping; Tilemap: 1 scrolling background with line scroll effect; Colors on screen: 482 (241 for backgrounds, 241 for sprites); Color palette: 512 (9-bit color); CD add-on: Full motion video (FMV)	Resolution: 320×224, 256×224 (NTSC), 320×240, 256×240 (PAL) (progressive), 320×448 to 320×480 (interlaced); Sprites: 80 on screen, 20 per scanline, 8×8 to 32×32 sizes, 16 colors per sprite, integer sprite zoom, sprite flipping; Tilemaps: 2 parallax scrolling planes with line & row scroll effects and tile flipping; Colors on screen: 64 to 75 (standard), 192 (shadow/highlight), 512 (160×224 resolution); Color palette: 512 (standard), 1536 (shadow/highlight); Upgrades: SVP enhancement chip: 3,000 texture mapping polygons/sec, 20,000 flat shading polygons/sec; CD add-on: Sprite/tilemap scaling & rotation, FMV with 128–256 on-screen colors; 32X add-on: Color palette: 32,768 (15-bit high color), 256–32,768 colors on screen, 40,000 Texture Gouraud Shading polygons/sec, 50,000 texture mapping polygons/sec, 100,000 Gouraud Shading polygons/sec, 160,000 flat shading polygons/sec	Resolution: 256×224 to 256×239 (progressive), 512×448 to 512×478 (interlaced); Sprites: 128 on screen, 32 per scanline, 8×8 to 64×64 sizes, 16 colors per sprite, sprite flipping; Tilemaps: 2–4 parallax scrolling planes (lo-res), or 1–2 scrolling planes (hi-res), or 1 scaling/rotating plane (Mode 7); Colors on screen: 256 (1–3 lo-res planes), 128 (4 planes), 128 to 160 (hi-res); Color palette: 32,768 (15-bit high color); Enhancement chips: Super FX: 2,000 flat shading polygons/sec, 1,000 texture mapping polygons/sec; Super FX 2: 4,000 flat shading polygons/sec, 2,000 texture mapping polygons/sec; Capcom Cx4: Sprite rotation/Calculations for wireframe effects; DSP-1: Advance Scaling and Rotation via Mode 7; DSP-2: Dynamic Scaling Capability and Transparency effects; DSP-3: Bitstream decompression, and bitplane conversion of graphics; DSP-4: Draw Distance	Resolution: 320×224 to 384×264 (progressive); Sprites: 380 on screen, 96 per scanline, double line buffering, 16×16 to 16×512 sizes, 16 colors per sprite, sprite scaling, sprite flipping; Tilemaps: 1 static plane, and optional 1–3 parallax scrolling planes with scaling and line & column scroll effects; Colors on screen: 4096; Color palette: 65,536 (16-bit high color)
Audio		Stereo audio with: 6 programmable WS channels/voices; Square, sine, sawtooth, triangle and other waveforms; White noise generation on 2 channels; LFO or FM on 2 channels; Optional streaming of samples through any channel; CD add on: 1 ADPCM channel, 12-bit audio, 32.088 kHz sampling rate; 1 streaming CD-DA channel, 16-bit CD audio, 44.1 kHz sampling rate	Stereo audio with: 6 FM synthesis channels/voices; 3 square wave channels/voices; Sine wave LFO; 1 PCM channel, 8-bit samples, 8 to 22 kHz sampling rate CD add on: 8 PCM channels (16-bit, 32 kHz); 2-channel stereo streaming CD-DA (16-bit, 44.1 kHz); Upgrades: SVP chip: 2 PWM channels; 32X add-on: 10-bit PWM, surround sound	Stereo audio with: 8 ADPCM channels; 16-bit audio, 32 kHz sampling rate; Optional Dolby Surround support	Stereo audio with: 4 FM synthesis channels/voices; 3 square wave channels/voices; 1 white noise generator; 6 ADPCM channels (12-bit) @ 18.5 kHz sampling rate; 1 ADPCM channel (16-bit) @ 1.8 to 55.5 kHz sampling rate

=== Other consoles ===
Name		PC Engine SuperGrafx	PC Engine Duo/TurboDuo	CD-i	Mega-CD/Sega CD
Logo					
Manufacturer		NEC		Philips	Sega
Console					
Release date		JP: December 8, 1989	JP: September 21, 1991; NA: October 10, 1992	NA: December 3, 1991; JP: April 25, 1992; EU: July 10, 1992	JP: December 12, 1991; NA: October 15, 1992; EU: April 1993
Launch prices	US$		US$299.99 (equivalent to $690 in 2025)	US$799 (equivalent to $1,890 in 2025)	US$299 (equivalent to $1,150 in 2025)
Launch prices	JP¥	¥59,800 (equivalent to ¥74,600 in 2024)			JP¥49,800 (equivalent to ¥70,090 in 2024)
Media	Type	HuCard	HuCard, CD-ROM	CD-ROM	Cartridge, CD-ROM
Media	Regional lockout	Region locked	Partial	Unrestricted	Region locked
Media	Backward compatibility	PC Engine	PC Engine	No	Sega Genesis
GPU		Hudson Soft HuC6260 Video Color Encoder (16-bit); Hudson Soft HuC6202 Video Priority Controller; Hudson Soft HuC6270A Video Display Controller (16-bit)	Hudson Soft HuC6260 Video Color Encoder (16-bit); Hudson Soft HuC6270A Video Display Controller (16-bit)	Philips SCC66470, MCD 212	Sega ASIC coprocessor
Sound chip(s)		Hudson Soft HuC6280A PSG with 6 Wavetable channels @111.87 kHz	Hudson Soft HuC6280A PSG; Oki MSM5205	MCD 221	Ricoh RF5c164
RAM		32 KB main RAM; 128 KB video RAM; 64 KB main DRAM, 64 KB audio DRAM	256 KB SRAM; 64 KB Video RAM; 8 KB Work Ram	1 MB RAM	512 KB main; 256 KB Video; 64 KB Audio; 16 KB cache; 8 KB Internal Back-up; CD BackUp Ram Carts: 8 KB to 512 KB
Video		Resolution: 256×224 to 565×242 (progressive), 256×448 to 565×484 (interlaced); Sprites: 128 on screen, 32 per scanline, 16×16 to 32×64 sizes, 16 colors per sprite, sprite flipping; Tilemap: 2 parallax scrolling sprite layers; Colors on screen: 512 (241 for backgrounds, 240 for sprites); Color palette: 512 (9-bit color)			
Audio		1 ADPCM channel, 12-bit audio, 32.088 kHz sampling rate; 1 streaming CD-DA channel, 16-bit CD audio, 44.1 kHz sampling rate; Optional Dolby Surround support	Stereo audio with: 6 programmable WS channels/voices; Square, sine, sawtooth, triangle and other waveforms; White noise generation on 2 channels; LFO or FM on 2 channels; Optional streaming of samples through any channel; 1 ADPCM channel, 12-bit audio, 32.088 kHz sampling rate; 1 streaming CD-DA channel, 16-bit CD audio, 44.1 kHz sampling rate; Optional Dolby Surround support	Stereo audio with: 8 ADPCM channels	Stereo audio with: 8 PCM channels (16-bit, 32 kHz); 2-channel stereo streaming CD-DA (16-bit, 44.1 kHz)

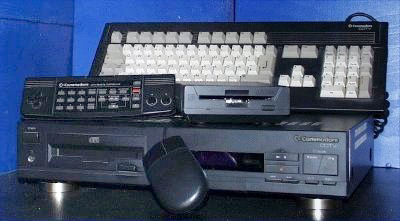
Commodore CDTV
Released in 1991

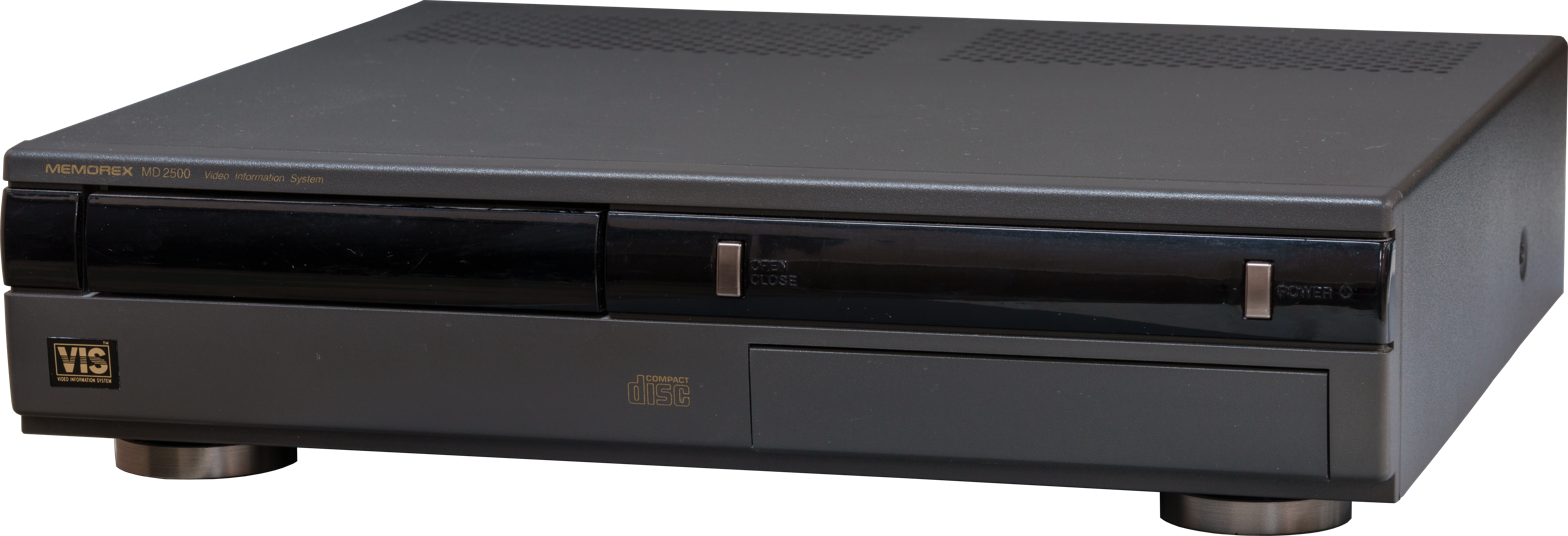
Video Information System by Tandy Released in 1992

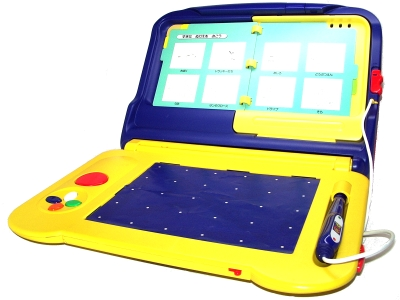
Sega Pico
Released in 1993

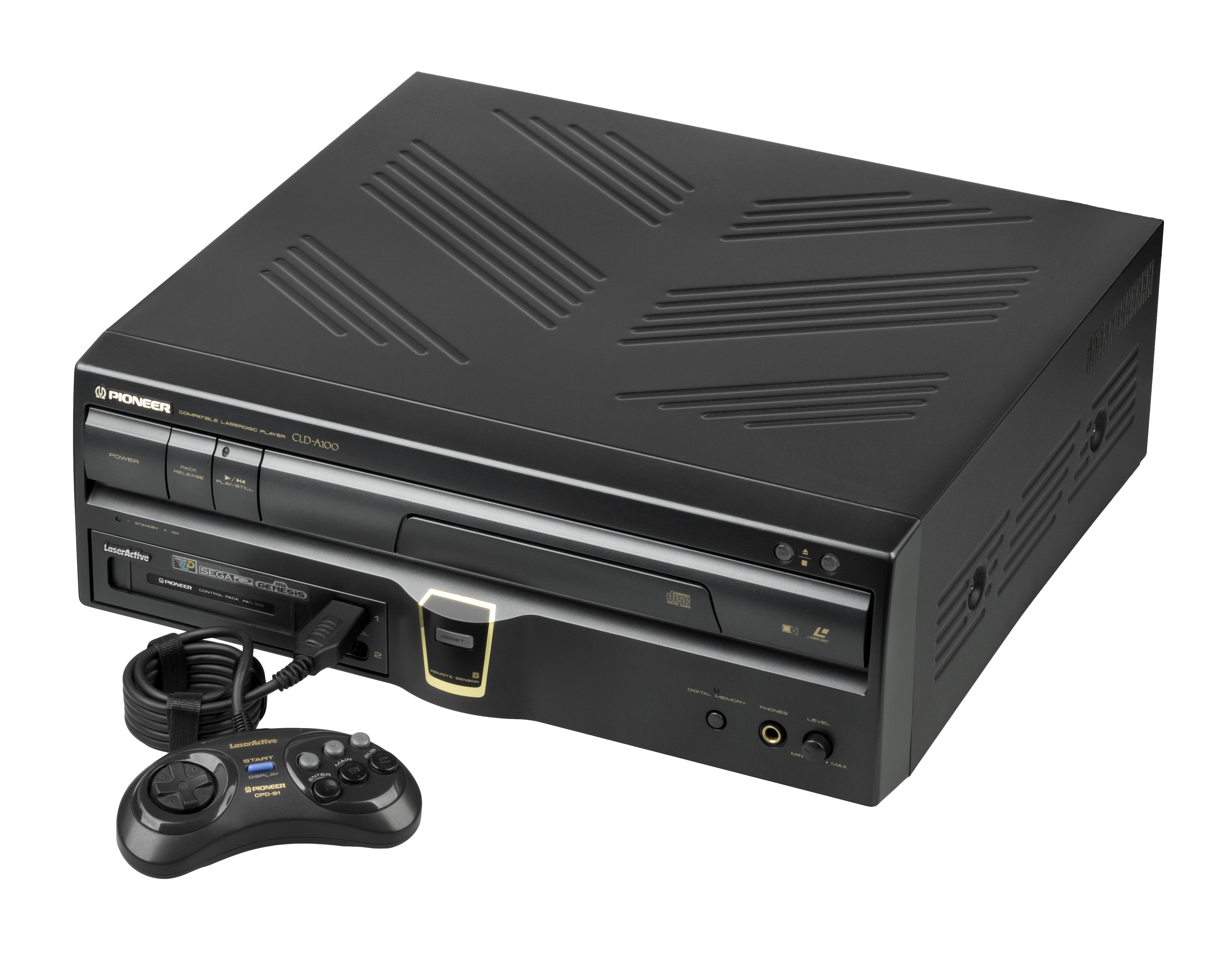
LaserActive by Pioneer
Released in 1993

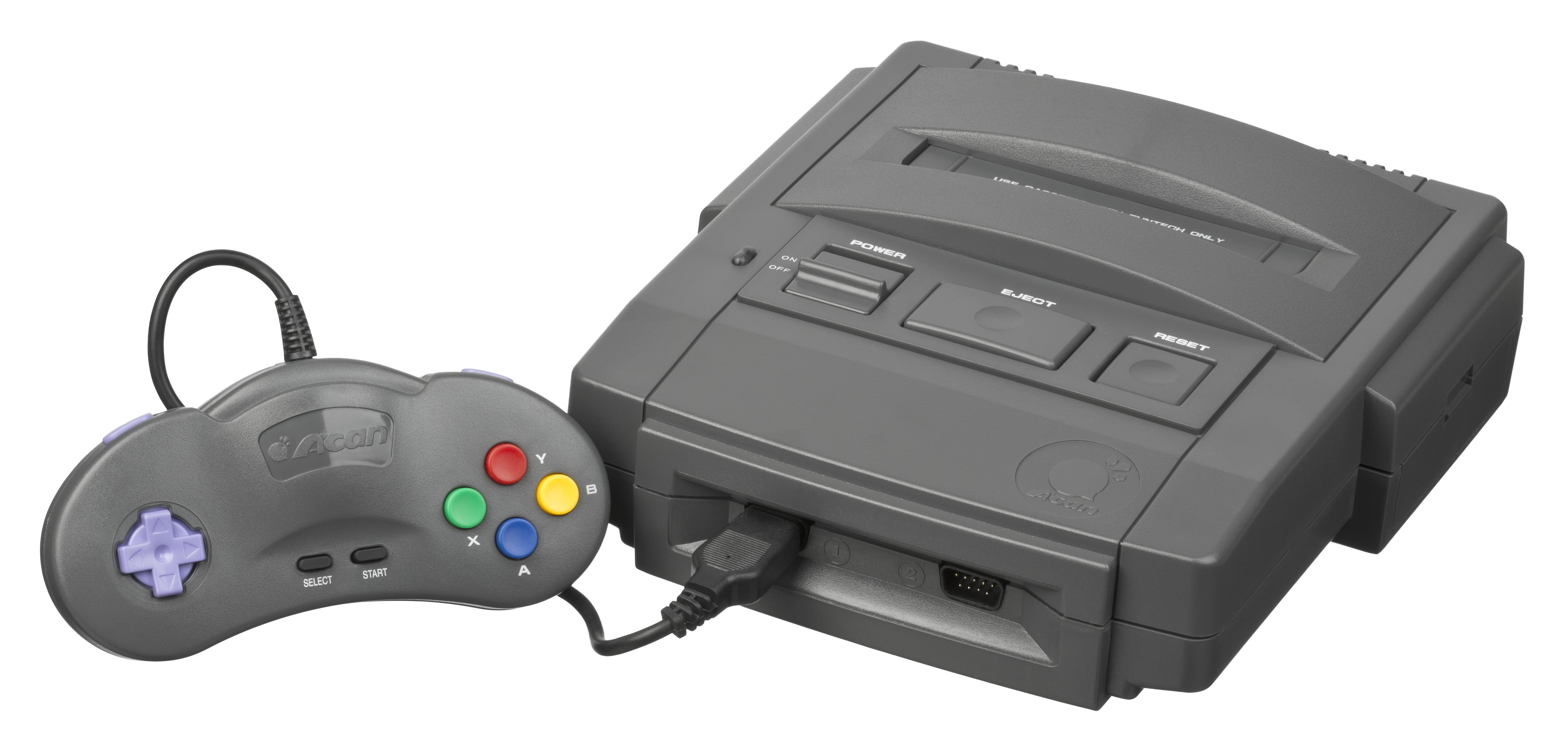
Super A'Can
Released in Taiwan on October 25, 1995

=== Worldwide sales standings ===
Console	Firm	Units sold
Super Nintendo Entertainment System	Nintendo	49.1 million
Sega Mega Drive/Genesis	Sega	30.75 million (Note: 30.75 million sold by Sega worldwide as of June 1996. 1.5 million projected by Majesco of the Genesis 3 in 1998. 3 million sold by Tectoy in Brazil as of 2012.)
PC Engine/TurboGrafx-16	NEC	10 million
Sega CD	Sega	2.765 million
PC Engine CD-ROM²	NEC	1.92 million
Philips CD-i	Philips	1 million
Sega 32X	Sega	800,000
Neo Geo CD	SNK	570,000
Neo Geo	SNK	410,000

== Handheld systems ==
The first handheld game console released in the fourth generation was the Game Boy, on April 21, 1989. It went on to dominate handheld sales by an extremely large margin, despite featuring an 8-bit microprocessor and a low-contrast, unlit monochrome screen while all three of its leading competitors had color. Three major franchises made their debut on the Game Boy: Tetris, the Game Boy's killer application; Pokémon; and Kirby. With some design (Game Boy Pocket, Game Boy Light) and hardware (Game Boy Color) changes, it continued in production in some form until 2008, enjoying a better than 18-year run.

The Atari Lynx included hardware-accelerated color graphics, a backlight, and the ability to link up to sixteen units together in an early example of network play when its competitors could only link 2 or 4 consoles (or none at all), but its comparatively short battery life (approximately 4.5 hours on a set of alkaline cells, versus 35 hours for the Game Boy), and high price, resulted in the Lynx only selling 2 million worldwide.

The third major handheld of the fourth generation was the Game Gear. It featured graphics capabilities roughly comparable to the Master System (better colours, but lower resolution), a ready made games library by using the "Master-Gear" adaptor to play cartridges from the older console, and the opportunity to be converted into a portable TV using a cheap tuner adaptor, but it also suffered some of the same shortcomings as the Lynx. While it sold more than twenty times as many units as the Lynx, its bulky design – slightly larger than even the original Game Boy; relatively poor battery life – only a little better than the Lynx; and later arrival in the marketplace – competing for sales amongst the remaining buyers who did not already have a Game Boy – hampered its overall popularity despite being more closely competitive with the Nintendo in terms of price and breadth of software library. Sega eventually retired the Game Gear in 1997, a year before Nintendo released the first examples of the Game Boy Color, to focus on the Nomad and non-portable console products.

Other handheld consoles released during the fourth generation included the TurboExpress, a handheld version of the TurboGrafx-16 released by NEC in 1990, and the Game Boy Pocket, an improved model of the Game Boy released about two years before the debut of the Game Boy Color. While the TurboExpress was another early pioneer of color handheld gaming technology and had the added benefit of using the same game cartridges or 'HuCards' as the TurboGrafx16, it had even worse battery life than the Lynx and Game Gear – about three hours on six contemporary AA batteries – selling only 1.5 million units.

=== List of handheld consoles ===
Console		Game Boy Game Boy Pocket Game Boy Light	Atari Lynx	Game Gear	PC Engine GT TurboExpress PC Engine LT
Logo					
Manufacturer		Nintendo	Atari	Sega	NEC
Image					
Release date		Game Boy; JP: April 21, 1989; NA: July 31, 1989; EU: September 28, 1990; Game Boy Pocket; JP: July 21, 1996; NA: September 3, 1996; Game Boy Light; JP: April 14, 1998	NA: October 11, 1989; EU: 1990; JP: 1990	JP: October 6, 1990; EU: April 26, 1991; NA: April 26, 1991; AU: 1992	PC Engine GT/TurboExpress; JP: December 1, 1990; NA: 1991 PC Engine LT; JP: December 13, 1991
Launch price	US$	US$89.95 (equivalent to $230 in 2025)	US$189.99 (equivalent to $490 in 2025)	US$149.99 (equivalent to $350 in 2025)	US$299.99 (equivalent to $710 in 2025)
Launch price	GBP	£69.99 (equivalent to £200 in 2025)			
Launch price	A$			A$155 (equivalent to $330 in 2022)	
Launch price	JP¥	¥12,500 (equivalent to ¥15,590 in 2024)		¥14,500 (equivalent to ¥17,550 in 2024)	
Units sold		118.69 million, including Game Boy Color	2 million	14 million	1.5 million
Media	Type	Cartridge	Cartridge	Cartridge	Datacard
Media	Regional lockout	Unrestricted	Unrestricted	Unrestricted	Region locked
Media	Backward compatibility	—N/a	—N/a	Master System (using adapter)	TurboGrafx-16 (HuCard only)
Best-selling games		Pokémon Red, Blue, and Yellow	RoadBlasters	Sonic the Hedgehog 2	Bonk's Adventure
CPU		Sharp SM83 @ 4.2 MHz	MOS 65SC02 @ 4 MHz	Zilog Z80 @ 3.5 MHz	HuC6280A @ 1.79 / 7.16 MHz
Memory		8 KB work RAM, 8 KB video RAM	64 KB RAM	8 KB work RAM, 16 KB video RAM	8 KB work RAM, 64 KB video RAM
Video		2.6 inch; 160×144; 4 shades of green/gray	3.5 inch; 160×102; 4,096-color palette, 16 colors per scanline	3.2 inch; 160×144; 4,096-color palette, 32 colors on-screen	2.6 inch; 400×270; 64 sprites, 16 per scanline; 512-color palette, 482 colors on-screen
Audio		Stereo audio (using headphones), with: Two square wave channels; One programmable waveform channel; One white noise generator	Stereo audio with: Four square wave channels; A built-in DAC for each channel	Stereo audio (using headphones), with: Three square wave channels; One white noise generator	Stereo audio (using headphones), with: Six programmable waveform channels; White noise generation; Optional streaming of samples

=== Other handheld game consoles ===
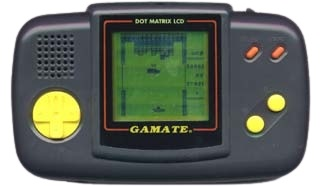
Gamate
Released in 1991

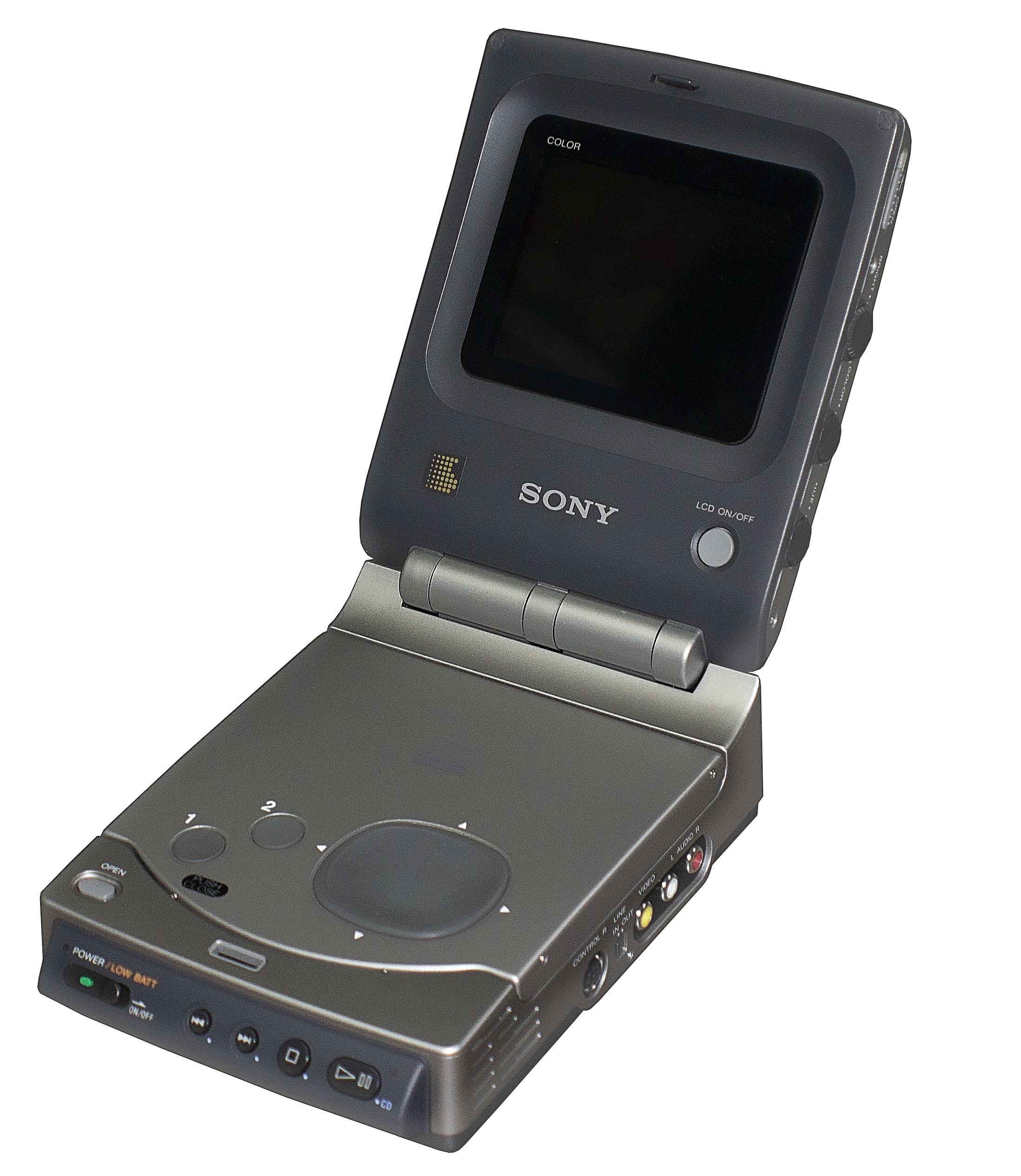
CD-i Intelligent Discman IVO
Released in 1991

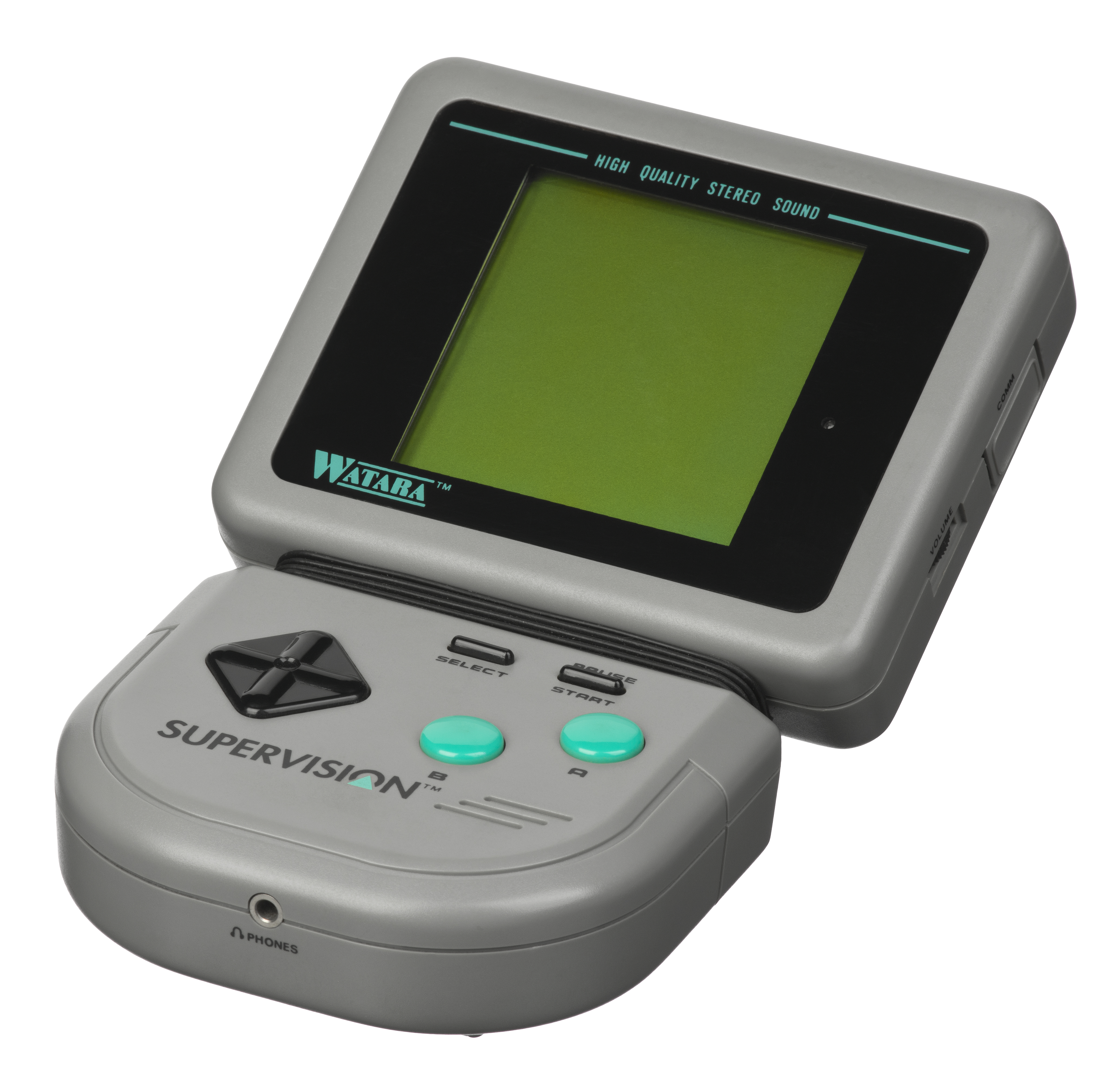
Watara Supervision
Released in 1992

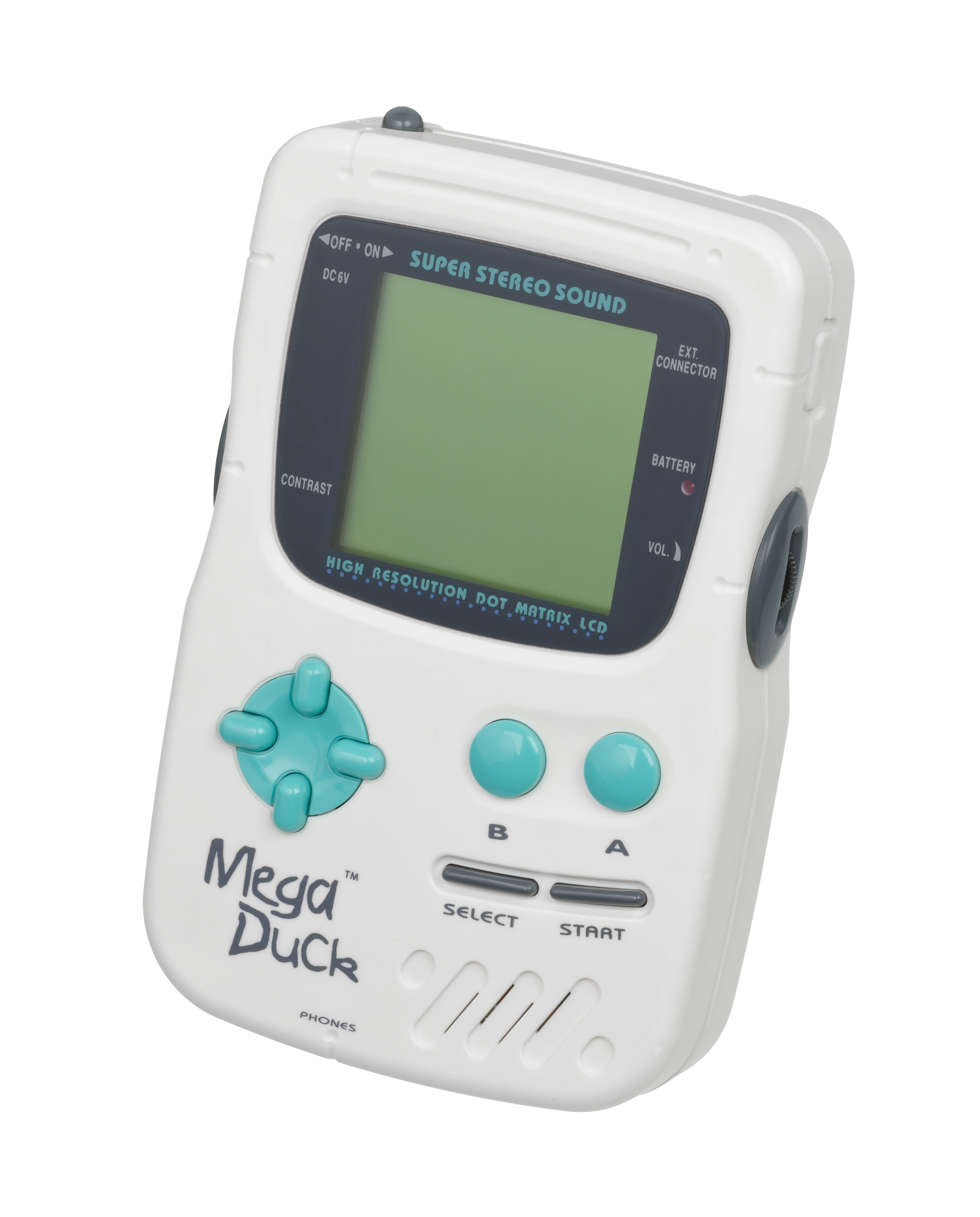
Mega Duck/Cougar Boy
Released in 1993

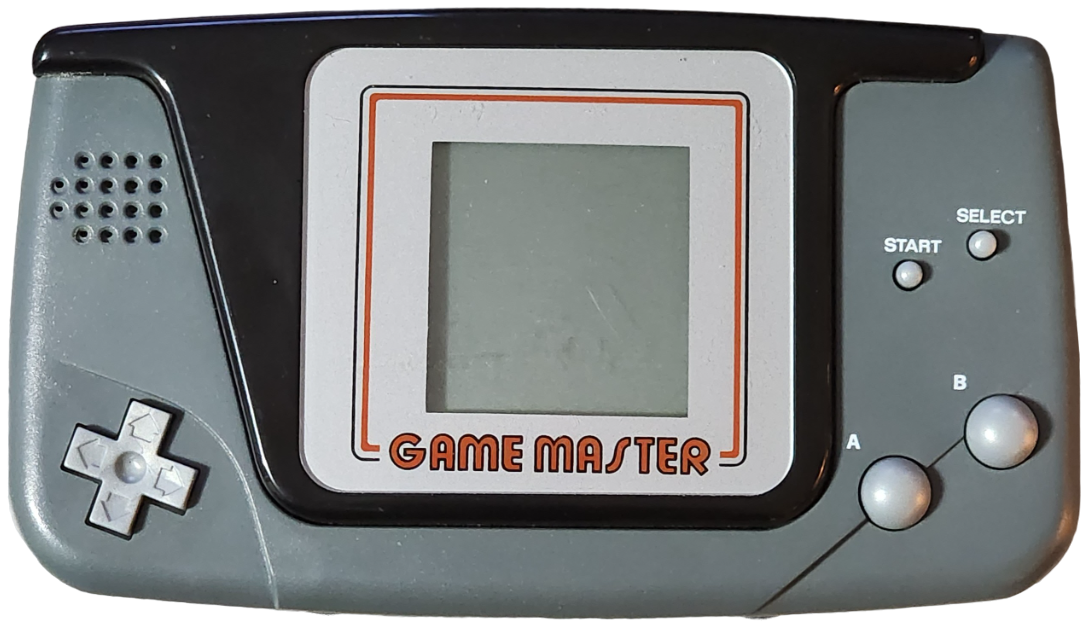
Game Master (console) (By Hartung) Released in 1990

== Milestone titles ==
- Chrono Trigger (SNES) by Square is frequently listed among the greatest video games of all time.
- Donkey Kong Country (SNES) by Rare and Nintendo turned the tide of the console war in favor of Nintendo and became the best-selling game since Super Mario Bros. 3, largely due to its impressive graphics.
- FIFA International Soccer (Genesis, SNES) by Extended Play Productions and EA Sports has been described as one of the most influential sports games ever made.
- Garou: Mark of the Wolves (Arcade, Neo Geo) by SNK is considered one of the best fighting games, as well as the "swan song" of the generation, receiving praise for its hand-drawn graphics, and the game's tight and streamlined control scheme.
- Gunstar Heroes (Genesis) by Treasure and Sega is considered one of the best action games of the generation.
- John Madden Football (1990) (Genesis, SNES) by Park Place Productions and EA Sports played an important role in the early success of both the Genesis console and Electronic Arts.
- Super Mario World (SNES) by Nintendo Entertainment Analysis & Development (Nintendo EAD) and Nintendo, a SNES launch title showcasing the console's capabilities with enhanced graphics and sound, as well as introducing new gameplay mechanics and expansive level design. It is often considered one of the best games in the series and it became the best-selling game of its generation and is cited as one of the greatest video games ever made.
- Super Metroid (SNES) by Nintendo Research & Development 1 and Nintendo is still regarded by many gaming organizations as one of the "best games of all time."
- Mortal Kombat (Arcade, Genesis, SNES) by Midway Games garnered heated controversy over its violent themes, with the uncensored Genesis version outselling the SNES version by nearly three-to-one, ultimately leading to a U.S. Congressional hearing and the creation of the Entertainment Software Rating Board.
- NHLPA Hockey '93 (Genesis, SNES) by Park Place Productions and EA Sports is considered one of the most outstanding sports games ever made.
- Phantasy Star II (Genesis) by Sega Consumer Development Division 2 and Sega has been cited as one of the best and most influential console RPGs.
- Sonic the Hedgehog (Genesis) by Sonic Team and Sega was Sega's bid to compete head-to head with Nintendo's Mario franchise, played a critical role in the success of the Genesis, and received widespread critical acclaim as one of the greatest games ever made, kickstarting a successful franchise.
- Street Fighter II (Arcade, Genesis, SNES, TurboGrafx) by Capcom was the second game in the series to produce a lasting fanbase and set many of the trends seen in fighting games today, most notably its colorful selection of playable fighters from different countries across the globe. As of 2008, it is Capcom's best-selling consumer game of all time.
- Streets of Rage 2 (Genesis) by Sega AM7 and Sega is considered the best beat 'em up of the generation.
- Super Monaco GP (Arcade, Genesis) by Sega set a new standard for realism in console racing games.
- Super Mario World 2: Yoshi's Island (SNES) by Nintendo Entertainment Analysis & Development (Nintendo EAD) and Nintendo is considered perhaps the finest 2D platformer.
- The Legend of Zelda: A Link to the Past (SNES) by Nintendo EAD and Nintendo courted popularity that was larger than that of its predecessors on the NES. It was one of the few action-adventures to be released early in the SNES's lifecycle. Zelda II on the NES had been mostly action-based and was side-scrolling, while A Link to the Past drew more inspiration from the original Zelda game with its top-down adventure format.

== See also ==
- 1980s in video games
- 1990s in video games
