= Game Master (console) =

1990 German handheld game console

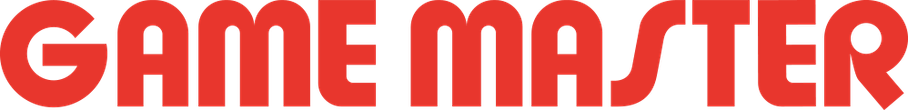

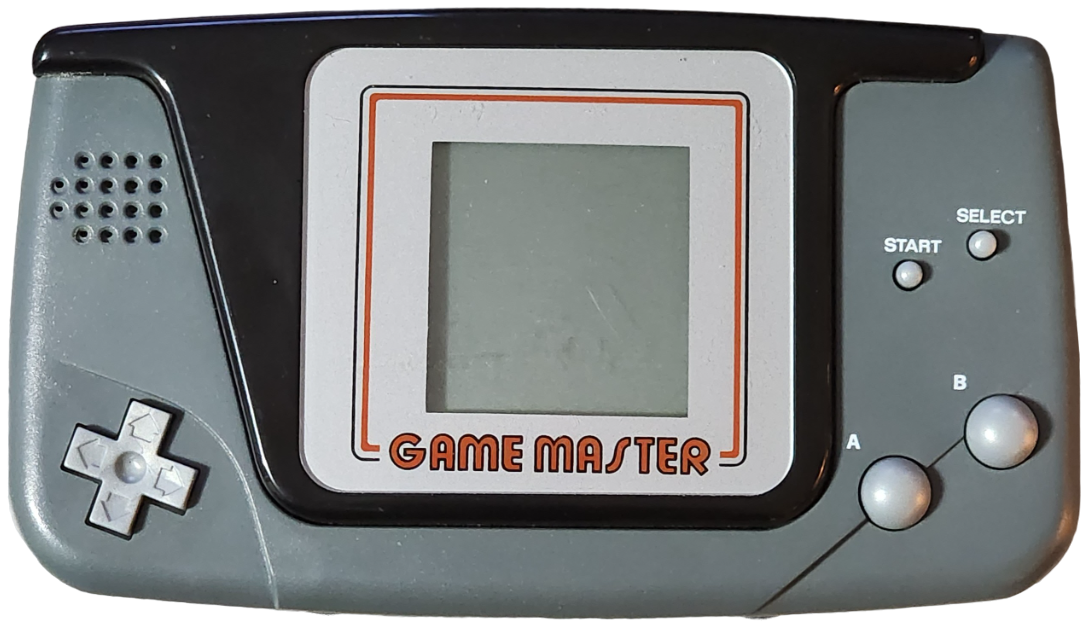
- Game Master
- Also known as: Systema 2000; Game Master; Game Plus; Super Game; Game Tronic
- Manufacturer: Hartung (DE); Systema (UK); Videojet (France); Delplay (France); Prodis (Spain); Virella Electronics (Italy)
- Type: Handheld game console
- Generation: Fourth generation
- Released: DE: 1990
- Media: ROM cartridge
- CPU: NEC upd7810
- Display: 61 × 64 monochrome LCD
- Sound: Built-in speaker Headphone jack 1 bit dac
- Power: 6-volt DC external power supply or 4 × AA batteries
- Dimensions: 170 × 97 × 33mm

The Game Master is a handheld game console manufactured by Hartung, and designed to compete with the Nintendo Game Boy. In Germany, it was marketed by Hartung itself, while in the UK it was released as the Systema 2000 by the already well-established maker of cheap LCD games Systema.

It was also sold under alternate names in France, including the Game Master by Videojet and Game Plus by Delplay, as well as for a few released by Hartung as the Super Game and the Game Tronic. It was sold in Italy by Virella Electronics.

The design was much like the Game Gear with a D-Pad and two action buttons, although another variation, the Game Plus, features a more Game Boy-like design which is backed by a company called Caterpillar and was sold by Delplay in France. The cartridges resemble those used by the Watara Supervision, with the card edge of the cartridge jutted out past the plastic of the cartridge. The Game Master utilizes a 40-pin cartridge port like the Watara Supervision but is not compatible with Supervision games.

== Models ==
- Hartung Game Master (Germany)
- Systema 2000 (United Kingdom)
- Videojet Game Master (France)
- Hartung Game Tronic (France)
- Hartung Mega Tronic (France)
- Hartung Super Game (France)
- Prodis PDJ-10 (Spain)
- Delplay Game Plus (France; incompatible with all Game Master cartridges)
- Impel Game Master (Hong Kong)

== Technical specifications ==
The Game Master has a 61 x 64 monochrome LCD screen.

- Color: monochrome black/white tones
- Power switch
- Contrast adjustment
- 4-way directional pad
- Headphone jack (unit includes small stereo headphones)
- A and B buttons
- Select button
- Start button
- Volume controller

== Games ==
Eighteen games were released for this console:

- Bubble Boy
- Car Racing [a.k.a. Super F-1 on title screen]
- Continental Galaxy [a.k.a. Continental Galaxy 2020 on title screen]
- Dungeon Advanture [a.k.a. Dungeon Adventure on title screen]
- Falling Block [a.k.a. Falling Block! on title screen]
- Finite Zone
- Go Bang! (Go Bang Game) [a.k.a. GO Bang.. on title screen]
- Hyper Space
- Kung Fu [a.k.a. Kung Fu Challenge on title screen]
- Move It
- Pin Ball
- Soccer (Fuss-Ball) [a.k.a. 3on3 Soccer on title screen]
- Space Castle
- Space Invader
- Space Warrior
- Tank War
- Tennis [a.k.a. Tennis Master... on title screen]
- Urban Champion
