= Ys I & II =

1989 video game

- North American TurboGrafx-CD box art
- Developer: Alfa System (Note: PlayStation 2 version developed by DigiCube; Nintendo DS version developed by Dreams; X68000 version developed by Beep.)
- Publishers: Hudson Soft: TurboGrafx-CD; JP: Hudson Soft; NA: NEC Technologies Nintendo DS; JP: Interchannel-Holon; NA: Atlus PlayStation Portable; JP: Nihon Falcom; WW: Xseed Games X68000 Beep
- Director: Masaya Hashimoto
- Designer: Masaya Hashimoto
- Programmer: Hiromasa Iwasaki
- Writer: Tomoyoshi Miyazaki
- Composer: Ryo Yonemitsu
- Series: Ys
- Platforms: TurboGrafx-CD, Windows, PlayStation 2, Nintendo DS, PlayStation Portable, Android, iOS, X68000
- Release: December 21, 1989: TurboGrafx-CD; JP: December 21, 1989; NA: May 23, 1990 Windows Complete; JP: June 28, 2001 Chronicles; JP: December 24, 2009 Chronicles+; WW: February 14, 2013 PlayStation 2; JP: August 7, 2003 Nintendo DS; JP: March 20, 2008; NA: February 24, 2009 PlayStation Portable; JP: July 16, 2009; NA: February 22, 2011; EU: February 23, 2011 Android, iOS; WW: April 29, 2015 X68000; JP: March 9, 2021
- Genre: Action role-playing
- Mode: Single-player

Ys I & II (Note: Japanese: イースI・II, Hepburn: Īsu I II) is an action role-playing game compilation released by Hudson Soft for the PC Engine CD-ROM² in 1989 and by NEC for the TurboGrafx-CD in 1990. It consists of enhanced remakes of the first two Ys games by Nihon Falcom for the PC-8801 home computer in Japan. It was released as Ys Book I & II for the TurboGrafx-CD in North America in 1990, and was a pack-in title for the TurboDuo in 1992. Ys I & II was released on the Wii Virtual Console in Japan in October 2007, and worldwide the following year. A port to X68000 was released in 2021.

== Overview ==
Ys I & II consists of enhanced remakes of the first two games released in the Ys series, Ys I and Ys II. It was one of the first video games to use CD-ROM, which was utilized to provide enhanced graphics, animated cut scenes, a Red Book CD audio soundtrack, and voice acting. The game's English localization was also one of the first to use voice dubbing. The game uses 732 megabytes of CD-ROM storage, including 41 music tracks, 24 minutes of character voice acting, and 20 minutes of animated cutscene sequences.

In both games the player controls a red-haired swordsman named Adol Christin. In the first game he must seek out the six Books of Ys. These books contain the history of the ancient, vanished land of Ys, and will give him the knowledge he needs to defeat the evil forces currently sweeping the land of Esteria.

In Ys II Adol is transported to the floating civilization of Ys inspired by the real-life mythical city Ys, and begins a quest to unravel the secrets of the land, and finally rid it and Esteria of evil.

== Plot ==
=== Ys I ===
Ys I begins with a cutscene showing the main character, Adol Christin, gazing out to sea at the Stormwall which appeared around the island Esteria six months ago. Determined to investigate the situation, Adol sets off towards Esteria on a small boat; however, it is sunk by the storm and Adol washes up on the shore of Esteria. He is saved by a villager named Slaff from the port town of Barbado. Adol recuperates in the home of Barbado's doctor and learns that Slaff is both the doctor's son and the head of the town's militia. The militia was formed when demons and monsters appeared on the island, at the same time as when the Stormwall formed. The Stormwall cut Esteria off from the rest of the world and completely halted the trade of silver, which is mined on the island.

Adol sets out to find out more about the island's situation in the largest town of Minea. There, he encounters a female troubadour named Reah. Reah is searching for her Silver Harmonica, which had been stolen, part of a rash of silver thefts that have occurred in the town. Linked with the thefts are sightings of a man in a dark cape. Adol then encounters the fortune-teller Sara, who tells him that she had a vision that a fiery-headed swordsman who would play a key role in Esteria's fate. She tells Adol of the six Books of Ys, named after the ancient kingdom that existed on the island seven hundred years ago. The Books of Ys contain the complete history of the rise and fall of Ys and will be instrumental in saving Esteria. Sara informs Adol that one book is in the Shrine of Solomon and sends him to the town of Zepik to speak with her aunt Jeba to learn more.

In Zepik, Jeba gives Adol the Key to the Shrine. Adol also meets the mayor of Zepik, and learns that the town's treasured Silver Bells have been stolen. The Silver Bells gave off a sound that drove evil away, and without it, Zepik is vulnerable to demon attack. Adol assumes a mission from the mayor to negotiate the return of the bells from a bandit group in the area. When Adol meets with the bandit leader Goban however, Goban protests that his group only steals from the corrupt to give to the poor, and that in fact all of the bandits' silver possessions have been stolen from them. Adol leaves them and enters the Shrine of Solomon.

Adol fights through demons through the Shrine of Solomon. In the lower levels, he rescues a young girl with long blue hair locked in a cell. The girl reveals that her name is Feena, and that a man with a dark cape imprisoned her there, but otherwise she has no memories about her past. Adol takes Feena to be looked after by Jeba, before returning to the Shrine, where he discovers the first Book of Ys on the lowest level. Returning to Minea, he finds that Sara has been murdered during his absence, with the culprit being a man in a dark cape. Sara had already given her most important possession to a friend to present to Adol - the second Book of Ys. It is revealed that Reah was the one who has Sara's Book of Ys, and she returns it to Adol in exchange for her Silver Harmonica. He is then directed to the mine of the ruined village of Rastin for the third book. Adol sets off to the mine and recovers that third Book from its depths, and returns to Zepik. There, he finds Feena recovering under Jeba's care.

Jeba and her family are descendants of the Ys priest Tovah, and thus Jeba is able to read the ancient text in the Books of Ys to Adol. The three books narrate the story of the creation of Cleria in ancient Ys, which brought great prosperity to the land. However, one day great hordes of demons suddenly appeared and attacked. An evil leader with six greater demons led the evil forces. The people of Ys retreated to the Temple of Solomon where they were besieged. During the siege the twin Goddesses of Ys suddenly disappeared from the Temple, and soon after the evil hordes also disappeared. The six Priests of Ys created the Books of Ys and imbued with magical power so that one day they might guide a hero to save the land of Ys. The people of Ys then reasoned that Cleria had been what attracted the evil and so buried it deep in the ground. Following this, Jeba tells Adol that the remaining books of Ys must be located in the great Tower of Darm, a towering structure which rises up to the clouds. The tower is nicknamed 'The Devil's Tower' and it stands in front of a giant crater named Bagyu Ba'dead.

The bandit leader Goban is revealed to be Jeba's son, and the bandits' lair was set up in at the entrance of the Tower of Darm to protect the island after the demons appeared. Goban opens the entrance for Adol, noting that his lieutenant Dogi was also somewhere in the tower, having previously entered with other bandits in a successful attempt to destroy the monsters in the tower. Adol climbs the tower, but is soon caught by a magic trap which teleports him into a prison cell. The cell is occupied by Luta Gemma, a sleepwalking poet from Zepik who was captured by the monsters. They are soon rescued by Dogi, who is able to punch through walls with his bare hands. Dogi sends Adol to seek a man named Raba on the upper floors. Raba was a scholar visiting Esteria who was inside the Tower of Darm, studying its history, when the demons suddenly appeared. Raba gives Adol a magical amulet which allows Adol to bypass the traps of the tower. In addition, Luta is a descendant of the ancient Ys priest Gemma, and Adol is given another amulet with the power to dispel magic seals. Adol climbs further, finding two more books along the way. Near the top of the tower, Adol discovers that Reah is also in the tower, having let herself be captured and brought there so she could give Adol a magic monocle which would allow him to read the language of the Books of Ys.

After reaching the top of the tower, Adol finally confronts the final antagonist – Dark Fact, a descendant of the ancient Priest Fact. Dark Fact boasts that Adol's efforts to collect the books have only helped his plan, and that once he took Adol's five books and combined them with his own, a great power would be revealed. The two fight, and Adol is victorious. In the folds of Dark Fact's cloak, Adol finds the final Book of Ys. As Adol uses the Monocle to read the entire set of books, a powerful white light fills his vision, and a feeling of serenity overcomes him. The monsters in the land dissolve into air, leaving it at peace. The words in the books begin to disappear and the forms of the Goddesses begin to materialize before him (it is noted that Adol does not recognize the Goddesses' faces). Adol rests and decides to tell Feena all that he has seen as soon as he returns to Zepik. Slowly, the white light envelopes his entire body.

=== Ys II ===
The story of Ys II continues off immediately from the end of Ys I. The game begins with an animated cutscene showing figures in a dark room talking to a glowing orb about Adol. They are impressed by his having conquered the Tower of Darm, and decide to continue to observe him. The view then shifts to the final moments of Ys I, with light emanating from the Books of Ys and surrounding Adol. Adol then suddenly is flown high into the sky by the magic from the books, as Feena and Reah watch from a cliff outside the tower. The magic energy deposits Adol and the Books of Ys in a flash of light in a field, where he is discovered by a girl. The view pulls back to show that Adol has landed on an island floating in the air.

A flashback to 700 years ago is shown: the two Goddesses of Ys are standing around a large glowing orb with their eyes closed, deep in concentration. Outside, a horde of demons lays siege to their location. A flying island is created, and soars high up into the sky, leaving a great crater behind. In the modern day, this island floats far above the Tower of Darm.

When Adol wakes up, he weakly asks the girl where he is. She tells him that her name is Lilia and that he is in Ys. Adol is brought to Lance Village and recuperates in Lilia's home. When he wakes up, Lilia's mother tells him about Ys and the surrounding area. Lilia's mother also asks Adol to deliver a letter to the town doctor, Dr. Flair, discussing Lilia's illness. Speaking to villagers of Lance, he learns that demons appeared on the island six months ago, which forced the villagers to abandon the nearby Rasteenie mines. In addition, most of the villagers are unaware that there is a world outside of Ys.

Adol goes to the town clinic to look for the doctor, but the doctor is not present. Suddenly, a flying pigeon arrives at the clinic bearing a message from the doctor, which states that he has been trapped in the Rasteenie mines by a cave in as he was picking herbs. Adol is asked to rescue the doctor from the mines, as only Adol could fight the demons inside. Adol agrees, and meets with the elder of the village to gain permission to enter the mines. The elder consents, but also mentions that he briefly saw two girls that resembled the Goddesses while walking in the ruins surrounding the mines. The elder also tells Adol that his having possession of the Books of Ys shows that he was guided by the spirits of the Priests of Ys to the island. The elder reveals to Adol that there is a place called the Sanctuary of Toal, connected to the Rasteenie mines, which houses statues of all six Priests, and that Adol should return the proper book to each statue in order to learn his purpose on the island.

Adol sets off towards the mines with these three goals. In the ruins outside the mines, Adol discovers a staff that grants him the potential to use magic after he touches it to a statue of the Goddesses. An elderly villager who witnesses this tells Adol that the six magics of the Priests of Ys are still scattered around the island and will be of great use in Adol's quest. Inside the mine, Adol quickly finds Dr. Flair and digs him out, delivering the letter from Lilia's mother at the same time. Dr. Flair reads it and tells Adol that he was searching the mine for the ingredients to cure Lilia's illness. In the rest of the mine Adol finds the herbs the doctor needs, as well as several magical spells. He returns to Dr. Flair with the herbs, and Dr. Flair creates a medicine for Lilia. When Lilia finds out that Adol risked his life to get the ingredients for the medicine, she is eternally grateful and swears a life debt to him.

When Adol returns the Books of Ys to the statues of the Priests of Ys, the spirits in the statues reveal that demons appeared on Ys at the same time as they appeared down below on the island of Esteria. They also revealed more about the history of Ys, stating that unknowingly, the source of demons was brought with them when they created the floating island 700 years ago around the Shrine of Solomon. Demons were created as a by-product of magic. The demons’ master resides in the Shrine of Solomon, the former home of the Goddesses and Priests of Ys. Adol must find the Goddesses and defeat the evil in the Shrine of Solomon in order to destroy all the demons forever.

Adol travels out of Lance towards the shrine at the center of the island, passing through the Glacier of Noltia and the lava filled Moat of Burnedbless, two geographical features created by the Goddesses 700 years ago as an attempted deterrent to demons attacking the shrine. In the moat, Adol discovers the Colony of Lava, whose inhabitants are all initially very hostile to him. Adol is barred from passing the bridge out of the village, but, by using the spells he has learned, he discovers that the bridgekeeper's son's Tarf was kidnapped by demons in order to force the villagers to stop Adol at Lava. Adol rescues the boy with the help of a friendly and intelligent demon named Keith, and is allowed to proceed onward from Lava.

Adol finally arrives at the village of Ramia, which stands right outside of the Shrine of Solomon. The past few months, the demons have been kidnapping villagers for use as human sacrifices. Adol meets with an elderly villager, Hadat, whose son, Sada, had recently entered the shrine in an attempt to save his kidnapped fiancée, Maria. Hadat gives Adol advice about the shrine and asks him to attempt to save Sada and Maria.

Adol infiltrates the demon filled Shrine of Solomon with the aid of a disguise spell. However, in the middle of the shrine, he is discovered by a dark-cloaked magician named Dalles (recognizable as the dark figure from the introduction cutscene). Dalles is able to see through Adol's disguise and curses Adol with a permanent demonic appearance. Returning to Ramia village to seek help, Adol is able to undo the curse with a help of a Sacred Cup that once belonged to the Priest Hadal. Any water put into it instantly becomes Holy Water, which allows Adol to escape Dalles' curse.

Continuing his infiltration of the shrine, Adol discovers the hideout of some kidnapped villagers who had escaped from captivity. Lilia is surprisingly among them, having left Lance Village due to dreams of needing to help Adol in his quest. Dalles once again makes an appearance, thanking Adol for leading him to the escapees, and turns everyone into stone, leaving only Adol unharmed so he would suffer mentally.

Undaunted, Adol keeps exploring the rest of the Shrine of Solomon, and again encounters the friendly demon Keith, who tells him that Maria is being held for sacrifice in a nearby bell tower called the Campanile of Lane. Adol enters the bell tower, fighting toward the top, defeating the demon sorceress Zava and seeing Maria along the way. At the top of the tower, Adol attempts to stop the ritual, but Dalles appears again and ensures the sacrifice is not disrupted. Adol then discovers the Dreaming Stone Idol, an artifact that is able to reverse magical petrification. He also notices that Maria has disappeared from where he had just seen her. With the artifact, Adol is able to return the stone villagers (including Sada) to normal before setting off to the innermost core of the shrine. Dalles appears once more to block Adol's way, and the two engage in a fight to the death, with Adol emerging victorious.

As Adol heads into the core, he finds that many villagers, all of them descendants of the Priests of Ys, have come to aid him. He also discovers that Maria had survived the sacrificial ritual, thanks to a magical bracelet passed down through her family. Lilia also appears, and provides Adol with a ring that can break the magic barriers barring his way. Right outside the final room, Adol discovers the two Goddesses imprisoned by magic energy. He is taunted by the voice of the master of the demons, who reveals that after 700 years, it has finally broken free of the imprisonment thrust upon it by the Goddesses and the Priests of Ys, and now demons would finally rule the world.

Suddenly, Goban Tovah and Luta Gemma from Ys I appear in the room. They had climbed the Tower of Darm after having a dream in which the Goddesses told them Ys was returning to the surface and they were needed. Goban provides Adol with Reah's Silver Harmonica, the sound of which dispels the energy binding the Goddesses. Adol is finally able to meet the Goddesses, who are confirmed to be Feena and Reah.

Reah explains the events that had led to this point: 700 years ago, after the demons had been defeated, the Goddesses sealed away the power of the Black Pearl, a great orb that was the source of magic in the society of Ancient Ys, as they had discovered the magic from the Black Pearl had caused the creation of demons as a side effect. The Goddesses also chose to stay behind on the surface of Esteria, and sealed away the magic-enhancing metal Cleria deep in the ground, after which they went into a long slumber. Centuries passed and all was peaceful, but some Cleria was accidentally mined by the inhabitants of Esteria while they were mining silver. This released enough magic to enable Dark Fact to break the seal on the Black Pearl, leading to the events of Ys I.

The Goddesses do not have the strength to seal the demons again, and must now rely on Adol to be their champion. With the descendants of the Priests of Ys and the Goddesses present, Adol is lent their power before he faces his final opponent: the sentient form of the Black Pearl, Darm. After a long battle, Adol is able to destroy it, wiping out all the demons in Ys.

Adol reappears in the sanctuary of the Goddesses, along with Feena, Reah, and all the descendants of the Priests. They all congratulate him and note that with the Black Pearl destroyed, the floating island of Ys was slowly sinking back to its original position, in the giant crater on Esteria. Tearfully, Feena says goodbye to Adol, as the Goddesses will once again enter a magic sleep to watch over Esteria and make sure the magic from the Black Pearl does not return, and she wished to confess her feelings for him before then, asking him to always remember her. They slowly part ways, as the inhabitants of Ys prepare for a new era, rejoined with the rest of the world.

== Remakes ==
=== Windows ===
Ys I & II Complete was a remake of Ys I & II released in Japan for Microsoft Windows on June 28, 2001. It contained updated graphics and FMV openings directed by Makoto Shinkai. Ys I & II Chronicles was released in Japan for Windows on December 24, 2009. It is based on Ys I & II Complete. An improved version dubbed Ys I & II Chronicles+ was released in North America and Europe on February 14, 2013, through Steam and later GOG.com.

=== PlayStation 2 ===
Ys I & II: Eternal Story was released on PlayStation 2 on August 7, 2003. Based on Ys I & II Complete, it also added new characters and items alongside the previous game's improvements. Eternal Story was also a Japan-only release.

=== Nintendo DS ===
Ys I & II DS was released on Nintendo DS in Japan on March 20, 2008, as separate games before it was bundled on April 18, titled Ys DS / Ys II DS Special Box. It was later released in North America on February 24, 2009, titled Legacy of Ys: Books I & II as a bundled package. The remake includes 3D graphics, updated sound (both using the previous Eternal edition as a basis), and multiplayer for up to 4 people. Each copy of the first printing of the game also includes a bonus soundtrack CD.

StageSelect.com awarded the Nintendo DS remake an 8 out of 10 and considers it a nostalgic addition to anyone's collection.

=== PlayStation Portable ===
Ys I & II Chronicles was released on PlayStation Portable on July 16, 2009. It is also based on Ys I & II Complete. XSEED Games localized and published the game in North America, where it was released on February 22, 2011. It was also released in Europe (only on PlayStation Network) on February 23. When starting a new game, the player can choose between two different game modes, which will display character portraits from the 2001 Windows release, or entirely new portraits created for this release. The soundtrack can be changed at any time during the game, between that of the PC88 release, the 2001 Windows release, or an entirely re-arranged instrumental soundtrack created for the PSP edition.

=== Android & iOS ===
Ys Chronicles I was released worldwide on mobile in April 2015, made by DotEmu. This version is based on the PlayStation Portable version of Ys I and is available for Android and iOS. In February 2016, Ys Chronicles II was released for Android and iOS.

== Reception ==
Contemporary reception

Review scores
| Publication | Score |
|---|---|
| Computer Gaming World | Positive |
| Dragon | 5/5 |
| Electronic Gaming Monthly | 35 / 40 |
| Famitsu | 35 / 40; 10 / 10 |
| GamePro | 24 / 25 |
| PC Engine Fan | 26.25 / 30 |
| VideoGames & Computer Entertainment | 9/10 |
| TurboPlay | 9/10 |

Awards
| Publication | Award |
|---|---|
| OMNI Magazine | Game of the Year |
| Electronic Gaming Monthly | Best RPG Video Game, Best BGM and Sound in a Video Game |
| PC Engine Fan | 3rd Best Game of All Time, 2nd Best Music & Sound, 5th Best Playability, 3rd Best Difficulty |

=== Contemporary ===
The game was critically acclaimed upon release. The August/September 1990 issue of TurboPlay magazine praised the game in its review, stating that the introduction sequence is "mind-blowing", that "everything, from the graphics to the gameplay, is incredible". GamePro said it "has got it all", including "great graphics, engaging RPG gameplay, and a brain-draining quest" as well as "stunning" music and "excellent animation sequences". Computer Gaming World reviewed the game in its December 1990 issue, where reviewer Roe R. Adams (who worked on the Wizardry series) stated that the "hottest advance in gaming this year has been the debut of programs on CD-ROM disks from Japan" and that "Ys is the first CD-ROM available here to actually show off the new capabilities of the technology". He praised the enhanced graphics and the "spectacular" anime cutscenes. He also praised the plot, including the "suspense" and "sense of urgency" during the climax, and the gameplay, including the various mini-quests and the enemy AI that "actually pursue the player, homing in on him and attacking". His only criticism against the game was the unusual "bump-and-grind" combat system.

The game was reviewed in 1991 in Dragon #172 in "The Role of Computers" column, where the reviewers gave the game 5 out of 5 stars. The review praised many aspects of the game, including "important characters whose voices can actually be heard", the cinematic sequences being "well done" and "extremely satisfying to watch" and the animation being "the best we've seen" in a TurboGrafx game, concluding that it is "a great adventure game that offers long play value, music, cinematic sequences, and role-playing action". Electronic Gaming Monthly's panel of four reviewers gave the game scores of 10, 9, 8, and 8, calling it the "most phenomenal RPG ever made". They compared its storyline to "a best-selling fantasy novel", praised its "outstanding use of voice and real music from the CD", and concluded the "game is magnificent from beginning to end, blowing away all competing RPGs hands-down". Their 1999 Video Game Buyer's Guide described it as still "one (well, two actually) of the best RPGs around".

=== Awards ===
In 1990, the game received the Game of the Year award from OMNI Magazine, as well as many other prizes.

Electronic Gaming Monthly awarded it the "Best RPG Video Game" and "Best BGM and Sound in a Video Game" awards.

PC Engine Fan, in its 1992 all-time rankings, selected Ys I & II as the third best game of all time, as well as second for best music and sound, fifth for best playability, and third for best difficulty.

=== Retrospective ===
Retrospective reviews

Aggregate scores
| Aggregator | Score | | | | | |
| Aggregator | DS | iOS | PC | PSP | TurboGrafx-16 | Wii |
|---|---|---|---|---|---|---|
| GameRankings | 71% | (Ys I) 78% | | 67% | 86% | |
| Metacritic | 67/100 | | | 63/100 | | |

Review scores
| Publication | Score | | | | | |
| Publication | DS | iOS | PC | PSP | TurboGrafx-16 | Wii |
|---|---|---|---|---|---|---|
| IGN | | | | | | 8.5 / 10 |
| Nintendo Life | | | | | | 9/10 |
| RPGFan | | | 100% | | 92% | |
| TouchArcade | | 4.5/5 | | | | |

Awards
| Publication | Award |
|---|---|
| Atlus, Gamasutra, GamesTM, GameZone, Hardcore Gaming 101, RPGamer, RPGFan | Best Game Music of All Time |
| Electronic Gaming Monthly, 1UP, GameSpot | Best Games of All Time |

RPGFan reviewed the game in 2001 and gave it a 92% score. It described it as "the first RPG on the first video game console CD-ROM" and stated that its "release heralded the evolution of the standard role-playing game", promising "a much larger, more colorful world, populated with lifelike characters who communicated with voice instead of text". It praised various aspects of the game, including the responsive controls, the graphics as having "stood the test of time", the soundtrack as an "audio masterpiece" (giving the sound a 100% score), the "vocal performances" and "dubbing" as surpassing "most gaming dubs produced today", the "fantastical world", and the "story of tragedy, hope and life". RPGFan gave the PC remake Ys Eternal a full 100% score, with reviewer Travis Lallman concluding that "Ys is the best game ever made". IGN reviewed the Wii's Virtual Console release of the TurboGrafx-16 game in 2008 and gave it a score of 8.5 out of 10. The reviewer Lucas M. Thomas described the "incredibly simplistic gameplay design choice" of "ramming" into enemies as "interestingly addictive" and found that it "streamlines the entire experience, which benefits the progression of the game's plot". He also praised the soundtrack as "one of the best to be heard" on the Virtual Console and concluded that it is "hard to argue against the value of getting two games' worth of content combined together into one double-length adventure".

On Electronic Gaming Monthly's list of "100 Best Games of All Time" in 1997, Ys I & II was ranked number 38. It later appeared on the list of "The Greatest 200 Videogames of Their Time" published by Electronic Gaming Monthly and 1UP in 2006, and on GameSpot's "The Greatest Games of All Time" list. On IGN's "Top 100 RPGs of All Time" lists, it received the number 100 spot in 2012, and has been ranked number 87 in 2017.

== Soundtrack ==
The game's early Red Book audio soundtrack was composed by Yuzo Koshiro, Mieko Ishikawa and Hideya Nagata and arranged by Ryo Yonemitsu. As one of the first CD soundtracks in a video game, the music and audio have been critically acclaimed since its 1989 release.

In 1990, TurboPlay magazine wrote that it gets the reviewer's "vote for having the greatest sound and music track ever recorded for a video game". In Computer Gaming World, reviewer Roe R. Adams (who worked on the Wizardry series) praised the "lush" background music, and speech "heard in real voice, not digitized!" In 1991, Dragon praised how the "voices can actually be heard" as well as the music.

In recent years, the soundtrack has been praised as some of the best video game music ever composed, by GamesTM, Kurt Kalata of Gamasutra and Hardcore Gaming 101, Leigh Alexander of Gamasutra, RPGFan, Atlus, RPGamer, and GameZone.
