= Streaming audio in video games =

Mechanism to play musical audio

In video games, music can be streamed, where the audio is pre-recorded and played back when required. While early video games were restricted to sequenced music, streaming music has become a more viable option as technology has improved.

== History ==
=== Arcade games ===
Early video game streaming was analog, sourced from a cassette tape inside an arcade cabinet. In the case with certain games that used FMV sequences, or were based entirely upon some type of video like 1983's Astron Belt and Dragon's Lair, carried audio streamed with the video. However, the continued reliance of arcade games on solid-state memory as opposed to optical media resulted in less use of streamed audio until the release of games such as Killer Instinct. This game used a magnetic hard drive with a comparatively high capacity and played back audio streams from the drive. Exceptions included the genre of rhythm games, which, by their nature, number music as an integral feature. Currently, many arcade game platforms are based either on similar home-console technology, or general purpose computers using x86 architecture.

=== Console games ===
Early console games with streaming audio were on CD-based systems such as the PC Engine CD-ROM² System in 1988, and the CD-i and Mega CD in 1991. With their increased storage size over previous media such as cartridges, streaming audio and video could be added to games. These games typically used Mixed Mode CD audio, similar to audio CDs, except on a Mixed Mode CD, the data and audio coexist. Because of this, many early games with streaming audio can be played in any CD player, although the first track, which typically makes up the game itself, will either not play or result in an unpleasant screeching noise which can damage the listener's speakers.

Some of the earliest examples of Mixed Mode CD audio in video games was the Ys series, composed by Yuzo Koshiro and Mieko Ishikawa, and arranged by Ryo Yonemitsu for the PC Engine from 1989. The Ys soundtracks, particularly Ys I & II (1989), are still regarded as some of the best and most influential video game music ever composed.

By the fifth generation of video game consoles, the majority of games with streaming audio adopted audio formats other than CD audio, which offered flexibility in sound quality and looping, where a track can repeat seamlessly until it is no longer needed, for example, until the end of a stage.

=== Computer games ===
Streaming audio in computer games came about with the advent of improved sound cards. Early sound cards had support for playing back sequenced but not streamed audio. It wasn't until Creative Labs's Sound Blaster series, introduced in 1989, that PCs became capable of playing back pre-recorded audio. However, the early Sound Blasters' streaming audio support was not widely made use of, and only with the 1992 release of the Sound Blaster 16, did the use of pre-recorded audio begin to catch on.

== Benefits and drawbacks ==
Use of streaming audio does not present any limitations on sound quality, where sequenced music is limited by the number of synthesized voices available and the quality of the wavetable (or sample) used by the sequencer. The instrumentation of streaming audio is limited only by a developer's capacity to record and master the audio. However, this complexity requires that audio streams be much larger in file size than sequences. Also, where sequenced audio can include dynamic shifts, such as additional orchestration during battle scenes, etc., streamed audio cannot. Some games, such as Super Mario Galaxy (2007), work around this by synchronizing sequenced and streaming audio so that additional effects can be added to the streamed music.
