= List of Super NES enhancement chips =

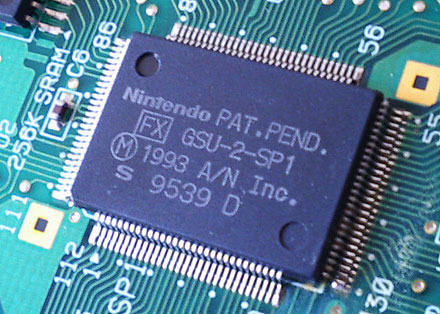
Super Mario World 2: Yoshi's Island has the Super FX chip.

The list of Super NES enhancement chips demonstrates Nintendo hardware designers' plan to expand the Super Nintendo Entertainment System with special coprocessors. This standardized selection of chips was available to licensed developers, to increase system performance and features for each game cartridge. As increasingly superior chips became available throughout the Super NES's generation, this provided a cheaper and more versatile way of maintaining the system's market lifespan than building a much more expensive CPU, or an increasingly obsolete stock chipset, into the Super NES itself.

The presence of an enhancement chip is often indicated by 16 additional pins on either side of the original pins on the underside of the cartridge, 8 on each side of the center pins.

== Super FX ==
Super FX renders 3D polygons in Star Fox.

The Super FX chip is a 16-bit supplemental RISC CPU developed by Argonaut Software. It is typically programmed to act as a graphics accelerator chip that draws polygons and advanced 2D effects to a frame buffer in the RAM sitting adjacent to it. Super Mario World 2: Yoshi's Island uses the Super FX 2 for sprite scaling, rotation, and stretching.

This chip has at least four revisions, first as a surface mounted chip labeled "MARIO CHIP 1" (Mathematical, Argonaut, Rotation & I/O), commonly called the Super FX, in the earliest Star Fox (1993) cartridges. From 1994, some boards have an epoxy version, and later a first revision is labeled GSU-1. Both versions are clocked with a 21.47 MHz signal, but an internal clock speed divider halves it to 10.74 MHz on the MARIO CHIP 1. The GSU-1 however runs at the full 21.47 MHz. Both the MARIO CHIP 1 and the GSU-1 can support a maximum ROM size of 8 Mbits. The design was revised to the GSU-2, which is still 16-bit, but this version can support a ROM size greater than 8 Mbit. The final known revision is the GSU-2-SP1. All versions of the Super FX chip are functionally compatible in terms of their instruction set. The differences are in packaging, pinout, maximum supported ROM size, and internal clock speed.

== Cx4 ==
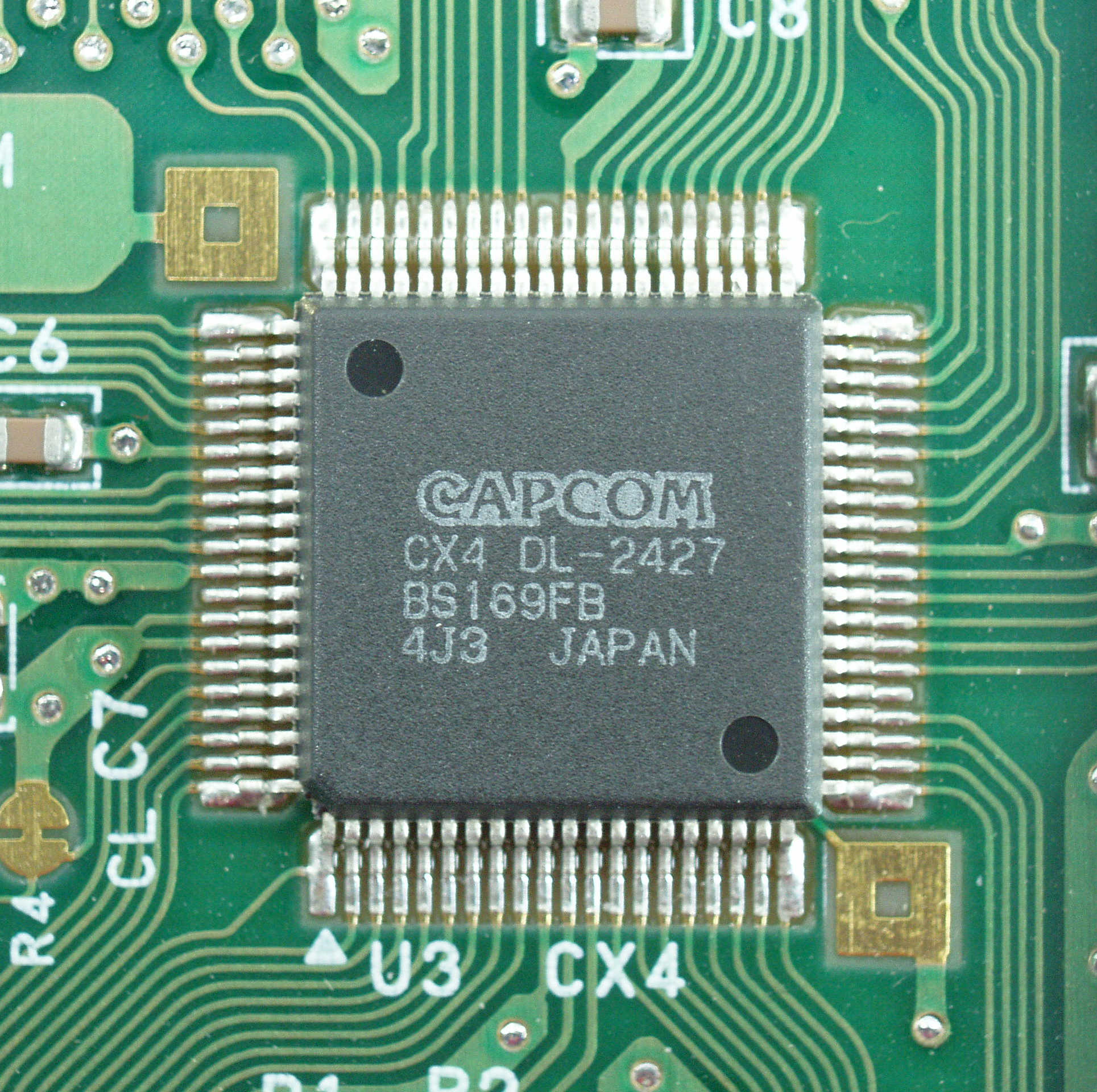
Cx4 coprocessor chip on a Mega Man X2 cartridge

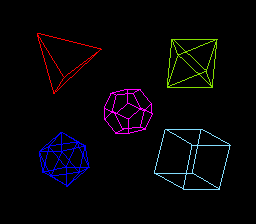
Cx4 wireframe test screen

The Cx4 chip is a math coprocessor used by Capcom and produced by Hitachi (now Renesas) to perform general trigonometric calculations for wireframe effects, sprite positioning, and rotation. It maps and transforms wireframes in Capcom's second and third games of the Mega Man X series. It is based on the Hitachi HG51B169 DSP and clocked at 20 MHz. The name Cx4 stands for Capcom Consumer Custom Chip.

A Cx4 self-test screen can be accessed by holding the 'B' button on the second controller upon system start-up in both Mega Man X2 and X3.

== DSP ==
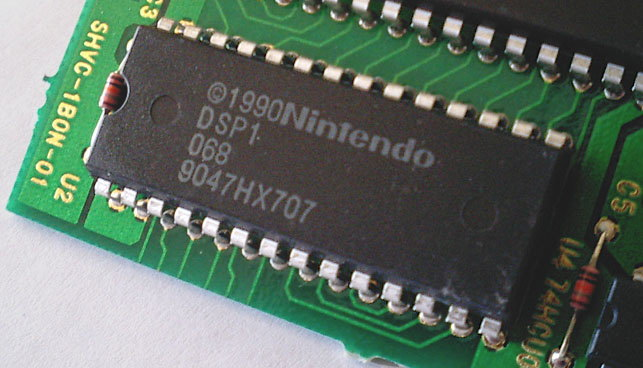
Pilotwings has the DSP-1 chip.

This series of fixed-point digital signal processor chips provides fast vector-based calculations, bitmap conversions, 2D and 3D coordinate transformations, and other functions. The chip has four revisions, each physically identical but with different microcode. The DSP-1 version, including the later 1A die shrink and 1B bug fix revisions, was most often used; the DSP-2, DSP-3, and DSP-4 were used in only one game each. All of them are based on the NEC μPD77C25 CPU and clocked at 7.6 MHz.

=== DSP-1 ===
The DSP-1 is the most varied and widely used of the Super NES DSPs, in more than 15 separate games. It is used as a math coprocessor in games such as Super Mario Kart and Pilotwings that require more advanced Mode 7 scaling and rotation. It provides fast support for the floating-point and trigonometric calculations needed by 3D math algorithms. The later DSP-1A and DSP-1B serve the same purpose as the DSP-1. The DSP-1A is a die shrink of the DSP-1, and the DSP-1B corrects several bugs. The DSP-1B introduced a bug in the Pilotwings demo due to the game code not being updated for the timing differences of the chip revisions.

=== DSP-2 ===
The DSP-2 is only in Dungeon Master. Its primary purpose is to convert Atari ST bitmap image data into the Super NES bitplane format. It also provides dynamic scaling capability and transparency effects.

=== DSP-3 ===
The DSP-3 is only in the turn-based strategy game SD Gundam GX for Super Famicom. It assists with tasks like calculating the next AI move, Shannon–Fano bitstream decompression, and bitplane conversion of graphics.

=== DSP-4 ===
The DSP-4 is used in only Top Gear 3000. It primarily assists with drawing the race track, especially during the times that the track branches into multiple paths.

== Sharp LR35902 ==
The hardware inside the Super Game Boy peripheral includes a Sharp SM83 core mostly identical to the CPU in the handheld Game Boy. Because the Super NES is not powerful enough for software emulation of the Game Boy, the hardware for the entire handheld is inside of the cartridge. Game Boy games however run approximately 2.4% faster than on an actual Game Boy due to a slightly higher clock speed. The Super Game Boy 2, only released in Japan, fixes this.

== MX15001TFC ==
This chip was made by MegaChips exclusively for Nintendo Power cartridges for the Super Famicom. The cartridges have flash ROMs instead of mask ROMs, to hold games downloaded for a fee at retail kiosks in Japan. The chip manages communication with the kiosks to download ROM images, and provides game selection menu. Some games were produced both in cartridge and download form, and others were download only. The service was closed in February 2007.

== OBC-1 ==
OBC-1 is a sprite manipulation chip used exclusively in the Super Scope game Metal Combat: Falcon's Revenge, the sequel to Battle Clash.

== Rockwell RC2324DPL ==
The Rockwell RC96V24DP is a low power, V.22 bis 2400 bit/s data/fax modem data pump in a single VLSI package, used in the XBAND cartridge.

== RTC-4513 ==
RTC-4513 is a real-time clock chip made by Epson used in one game, Tengai Makyou Zero.

== S-DD1 ==
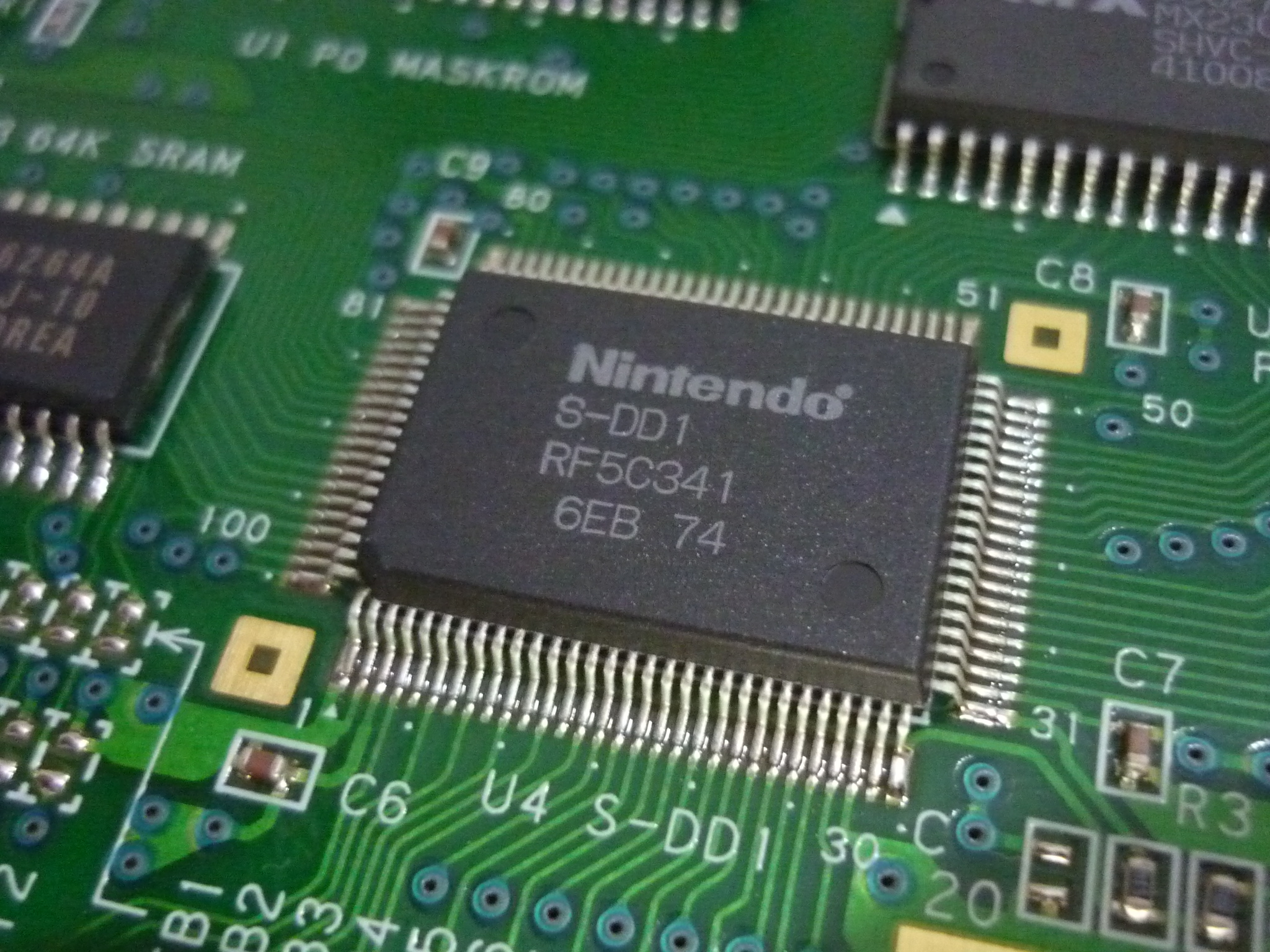
Star Ocean has the S-DD1 chip.

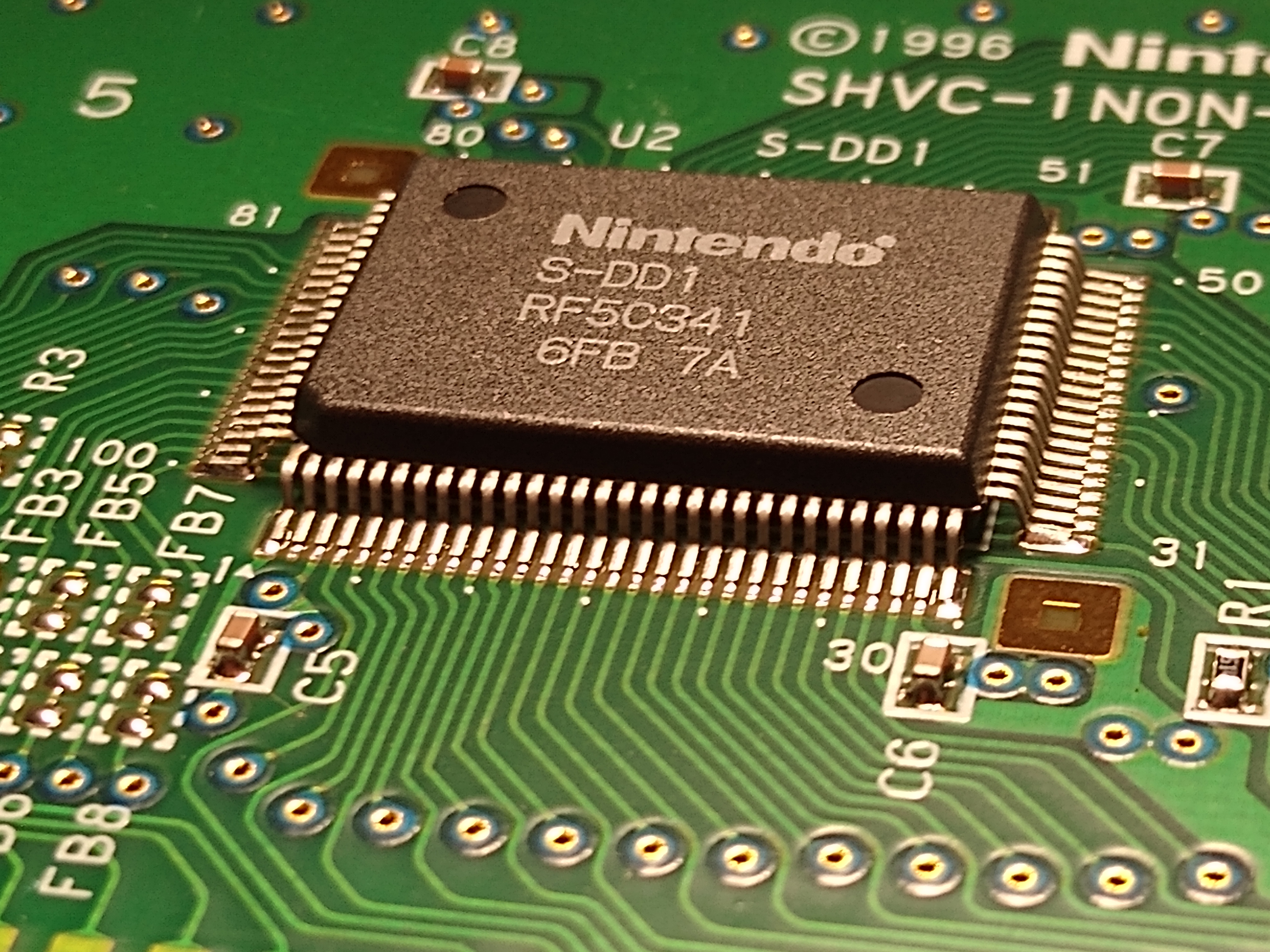
Street Fighter Alpha 2 has the S-DD1 Chip.

The S-DD1 chip is an ASIC decompressor made by Nintendo for use in some Super Nintendo Entertainment System Game Paks. Designed to handle data compressed by the ABS Lossless Entropy Algorithm, a form of run-length encoding developed by Ricoh, its use is necessary in games where massive amounts of sprite data are compressed with a total design limit of 32-megabits. This data is decompressed dynamically by the S-DD1 and given directly to the picture processing unit.

The S-DD1 mediates between the Super NES's Ricoh 5A22 CPU and the game's ROM via two buses. However, the controlling 5A22 processor may still request normal, uncompressed data from the game's ROM even if the S-DD1 is already busy with a decompression operation. This form of parallelism allows sprite data to be decompressed while other types of data are quickly passed to the main CPU.

Star Ocean and Street Fighter Alpha 2 are the only games that use this chip. Emulation of the S-DD1 was initially difficult, requiring "graphics packs" to be provided for the affected games, until the compression algorithm was identified.

== S-RTC ==
S-RTC is a real-time clock chip used in one game, Daikaijuu Monogatari II.

== SA1 ==
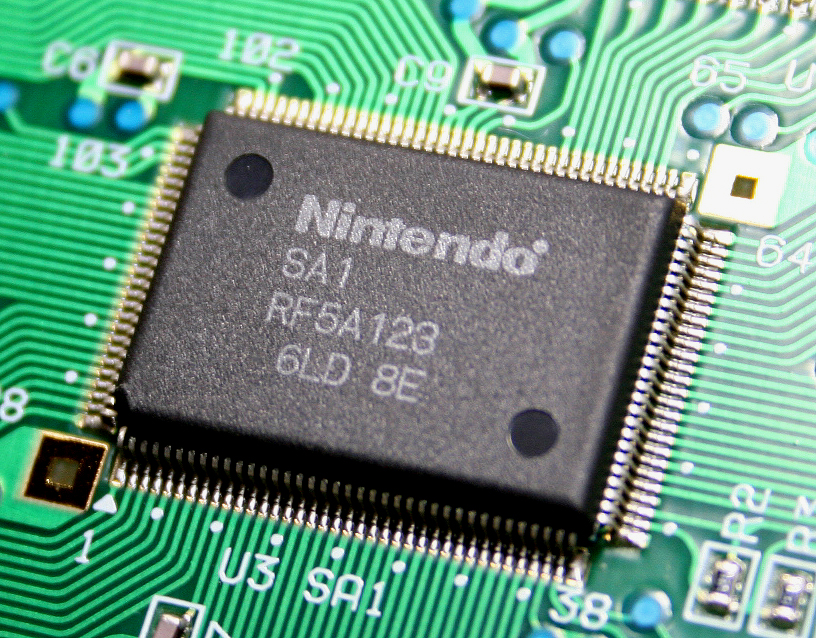
SA1 chip

The Super Accelerator 1 (SA1) chip is used in 35 Super NES games, including the well-known Super Mario RPG: Legend of the Seven Stars, published since 1995.

Similar to the 5A22 CPU in the Super NES hardware, the SA1 contains a processor core based on the 65C816 with several programmable timers. The SA1 does not function as a slave CPU for the 5A22; both can interrupt each other independently.

The SA1 also features a range of enhancements over the standard 65C816:

- 10.74 MHz clock speed, compared to the 5A22's maximum of 3.58 MHz
- Faster RAM, including 2 KB of internal RAM
- Memory mapping capabilities
- Limited data storage and compression
- New DMA modes such as bitmap to bit plane transfer
- Arithmetic functions (multiplication, division, and cumulative)
- Hardware timer (either as a linear 18-bit timer, or synchronised with the PPU to generate an IRQ at a specific H/V scanline location)
- Built-in CIC (Checking Integrated Circuit), for copy protection and regional marketing control, instead of the separate D41x or F41x in the cartridge

== SPC7110 ==
A data decompression chip designed by Epson, used in three games by Hudson. Of those, Tengai Makyou Zero also contains an RTC-4513 real-time clock chip accessed via the SPC7110.

== ST ==
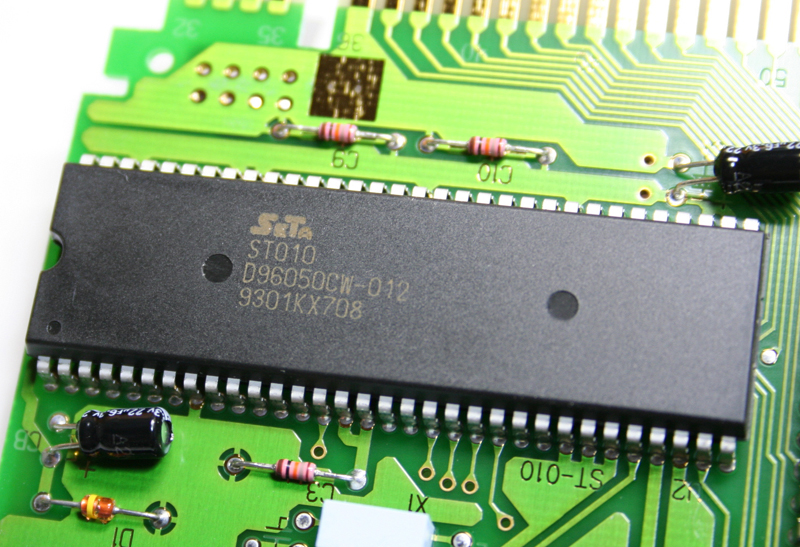
Exhaust Heat II has the ST010 chip.

The ST series of chips are used by SETA Corporation to enhance AI.

=== ST010 ===
Used for general functions and handling the AI of opponent cars in F1 ROC II: Race of Champions. It contains a NEC μPD96050 DSP, clocked at 10Mhz.

=== ST011 ===
ST011 is used for AI functionality in the shogi board game Hayazashi Nidan Morita Shogi. It also uses a NEC μPD96050, clocked at 15 Mhz.

=== ST018 ===
The ST018 is used for AI functionality in Hayazashi Nidan Morita Shogi 2. It is a 21.44 MHz 32-bit ARMv3 processor, most likely an ARM60.

== Zilog Z8523310VSC ==
In 1995, BT ran a trial for BT Interactive TV in the UK which would allow users to download Super NES games. The BT GameCart was a Super NES Game Pak which included a Zilog Z8523310VSC serial communication controller and serial port to interface with the Apple Interactive Television Box.

== List of Super NES games with enhancement chips ==
Title	Chip	Year	Developer	Publisher
Mega Man X2 ^{NA, PAL} Rockman X2 ^{JP}	CX4	1994	Capcom	Capcom (NA, JP, PAL)
Mega Man X3 ^{NA, PAL} Rockman X3 ^{JP}	CX4	1995	Capcom, Minakuchi Engineering	Capcom (NA, JP)
Soukou Kihei Votoms: The Battling Road	DSP-1	1993	Genki	Takara (JP)
Bike Daisuki! Hashiriya Kon - Rider's Spirits	DSP-1	1994	Genki	NCS (JP)
Final Stretch	DSP-1	1993	Genki	LOZC (JP)
Super Air Diver ^{JP, PAL} Lock On ^{NA}	DSP-1	1993	Copya System	Vic Tokai (NA), Asmik (JP), Sunsoft (PAL)
Michael Andretti's Indy Car Challenge	DSP-1/1A	1994	Genki	Bullet-Proof Software (NA, JP)
Pilotwings	DSP-1/1B (Note: On cartridges with DSP-1B, the plane in attract mode crashes.)	1990	Nintendo EAD	Nintendo (NA, JP, PAL)
Shutokō Battle '94: Keichii Tsuchiya Drift King	DSP-1B	1994	Genki	Bullet-Proof Software (JP)
Shutokō Battle 2: Drift King Keichii Tsuchiya & Masaaki Bandoh	DSP-1B	1995	Genki	Bullet-Proof Software (JP)
Suzuka 8 Hours	DSP-1	1993	Arc System Works	Namco (NA, JP)
Super Air Diver 2	DSP-1	1995	Copya System	Asmik (JP)
Super Bases Loaded 2 ^{NA} Super 3D Baseball ^{JP} Korean League ^{KR}	DSP-1	1993	Tose	Jaleco (NA, JP, KR)
Super F1 Circus Gaiden	DSP-1	1995		Nichibutsu (JP)
Battle Racers	DSP-1	1995	Banpresto	Banpresto (JP)
Super Mario Kart	DSP-1/1B	1992	Nintendo EAD	Nintendo (NA, JP, PAL)
Ace o Nerae! 3D Tennis	DSP-1A	1993	Telenet Japan	Telenet Japan (JP)
Ballz 3D	DSP-1B	1994	PF.Magic	Accolade (NA)
Dungeon Master	DSP-2	1992	FTL Games	JVC / Victor (NA, JP, PAL)
SD Gundam GX	DSP-3	1994	BEC	Bandai (JP)
Top Gear 3000 ^{NA PAL} The Planet's Champ TG 3000 ^{JP}	DSP-4	1995	Gremlin Interactive	Kemco (NA, JP), Gremlin Interactive (PAL)
Metal Combat: Falcon's Revenge	OBC-1	1993	Intelligent Systems	Nintendo (NA, PAL)
Asahi Shinbun Rensai: Katou Hifumi Shougi - Shingiryuu	SA1	1995	Varie	Varie (JP)
Daisenryaku Expert WWII: War in Europe	SA1	1996	SystemSoft Alpha	ASCII Corporation (JP)
Derby Jockey 2	SA1	1995	Graphic Research	Asmik (JP)
Dragon Ball Z: Hyper Dimension	SA1	1996	Tose	Bandai (JP, FR)
Habu Meijin no Omoshiro Shōgi	SA1	1995	Access	Tomy (JP)
Rin Kaihou Kudan no Igo Daidou	SA1	1996		Ask Kodansha (JP)
Itoi Shigesato no Bass Tsuri No. 1	SA1	1997	Dice, HAL Laboratory	Nintendo (JP)
J.League '96 Dream Stadium	SA1	1996		Hudson Soft (JP)
Jikkyou Oshaberi Parodius	SA1	1995	Konami	Konami (JP)
Jumpin' Derby	SA1	1996	KID	Naxat Soft (JP)
Kakinoki Shogi	SA1	1995	Sakata SAS	ASCII Corporation (JP)
Kirby Super Star ^{NA} Hoshi No Kirby Super Deluxe ^{JP} Kirby's Fun Pak ^{PAL}	SA1	1996	HAL Laboratory	Nintendo (NA, JP, PAL)
Kirby's Dream Land 3 ^{NA} Hoshi no Kirby 3 ^{JP}	SA1	1997	HAL Laboratory	Nintendo (NA, JP)
Marvelous: Mouhitotsu no Takarajima	SA1	1996	Nintendo R&D2	Nintendo (JP)
Masters New: Haruka Naru Augusta 3	SA1	1995	T&E Soft	T&E Soft (JP)
Mini 4WD Shining Scorpion Let's & Go!!	SA1	1996	KID	ASCII Corporation (JP)
Pebble Beach no Hotou: New Tournament Edition	SA1	1996	T&E Soft	T&E Soft (JP)
Pachi-Slot Monogatari - PAL Kougyou Special	SA1	1995		Nihon Soft System (JP)
PGA European Tour	SA1	1996	Halestorm	THQ / Black Pearl Software (NA, PAL)
PGA Tour 96	SA1	1995	Black Pearl Software	Electronic Arts (NA, PAL)
Power Rangers Zeo: Battle Racers	SA1	1996	Natsume Co., Ltd.	Bandai (NA, PAL)
Pro Kishi Jinsei Simulation: Shōgi no Hanamichi	SA1	1996	Access	Atlus (JP)
Saikousoku Shikou Shougi Mahjong	SA1	1995	Varie	Varie (JP)
SD F-1 Grand Prix	SA1	1995	Video System	Video System (JP)
SD Gundam G NEXT	SA1	1995	Japan Art Media	Bandai (JP)
Shin Shogi Club	SA1	1995		Hect (JP)
Shogi Saikyou	SA1	1995		Magical Company (JP)
Shogi Saikyou 2	SA1	1996		Magical Company (JP)
Super Bomberman Panic Bomber World	SA1	1995	Hudson Soft	Hudson Soft (JP)
Super Mario RPG: Legend of the Seven Stars ^{NA} Super Mario RPG ^{JP}	SA1	1996	Square	Nintendo (NA, JP)
Super Robot Taisen Gaiden: Masō Kishin - The Lord Of Elemental	SA1	1996	Winkysoft	Banpresto (JP)
Super Shougi 3: Kitaihei	SA1	1995		I'Max (JP)
Taikyoku Igo: Idaten	SA1	1995	Bullet-Proof Software	Bullet-Proof Software (JP)
Takemiya Masaki Kudan no Igo Taishou	SA1	1995		KSS (JP)
Star Ocean	S-DD1	1996	tri-Ace	Enix (JP)
Street Fighter Alpha 2 ^{NA, PAL} Street Fighter Zero 2 ^{JP}	S-DD1	1996	Capcom	Nintendo (NA, PAL), Capcom (JP)
Daikaijuu Monogatari II	S-RTC	1996	AIM, Birthday	Hudson Soft (JP)
Far East of Eden Zero (Tengai Makyou Zero)	SPC7110, RTC-4513	1995	Red Company	Hudson Soft (JP)
Momotaro Dentetsu Happy	SPC7110	1996	Make Software	Hudson Soft (JP)
Super Power League 4	SPC7110	1996	Now Production	Hudson Soft (JP)
F1 ROC II: Race of Champions ^{NA} Exhaust Heat II: F-1 Driver no Kiseki ^{JP}	ST010	1993	SETA Corporation	SETA Corporation (NA, JP)
Hayazashi Nidan Morita Shogi	ST011	1993	Random House	SETA Corporation (JP)
Hayazashi Nidan Morita Shogi 2	ST018	1995	Random House	SETA Corporation (JP)
Star Fox ^{NA, JP} Starwing ^{PAL}	Super FX GSU-1	1993	Nintendo EAD, Argonaut Software	Nintendo (NA, JP, PAL)
Stunt Race FX ^{NA, PAL} Wild Trax ^{JP}	Super FX GSU-1	1994	Nintendo EAD, Argonaut Software	Nintendo (NA, JP PAL)
Vortex ^{NA, PAL} Vortex: The FX Robot Battle ^{JP}	Super FX GSU-1	1994	Argonaut Software	Electro Brain (NA), Pack-In-Video (JP), Sony Imagesoft (PAL)
Dirt Racer	Super FX GSU-1	1995	MotiveTime	Elite Systems (PAL)
Dirt Trax FX	Super FX GSU-1	1995	Sculptured Software	Acclaim Entertainment (NA, PAL)
Super Mario World 2: Yoshi's Island ^{NA, PAL} Super Mario: Yossy Island ^{JP}	Super FX GSU-2	1995	Nintendo EAD	Nintendo (NA, JP, PAL)
Doom	Super FX GSU-2	1995	Sculptured Software	Williams (NA), Imagineer (JP), Ocean (PAL)
Winter Gold ^{PAL} FX Skiing^{NA} (canceled)	Super FX GSU-2	1996	Funcom	Nintendo (PAL)

=== Canceled games ===
Title	Chip	Year	Developer	Publisher
Star Fox 2 (Note: Star Fox 2 was eventually released in 2017 in the Super NES Classic Edition with Super FX GSU-1 emulation.)	Super FX GSU-1	-	Nintendo EAD, Argonaut Software	Nintendo
FX Fighter (Note: FX Fighter was later released as a PC game without use of a Super FX chip)	Super FX GSU-2	-	Argonaut Software	GTE Entertainment (NA, PAL)
Comanche	Super FX GSU-2	-	Nova Logic	Nova Logic (NA)
Powerslide	Super FX GSU-1	-	Elite Systems	Elite Systems (PAL)
Transformers	Super FX GSU-1	-	Argonaut Software	

== See also ==
- Memory management controller is the Nintendo Entertainment System's (NES) previous generation of enhancement chips.
- Super 8, an unlicensed peripheral which includes a NES on a chip
