= DSP1 =

DSP1 or DSP-1 may refer to:

- AT&T DSP1
- DSP (Nintendo)
- Yamaha DSP-1
