= Race of Champions (disambiguation) =

Race of Champions is an international motorsport event.

Race of Champions may also refer to:

- Race of Champions (Brands Hatch), Formula One race
- Race of Champions (modified racing), touring series and race competition for modified stock cars
- Race of Champions (Irish greyhounds), an Irish greyhound competition
- 1984 Nürburgring Race of Champions, exhibition production car race

== Video games ==
- F1 ROC: Race of Champions, a 1992 video game
- F1 ROC II: Race of Champions, a 1993 video game
- Michelin Rally Masters: Race of Champions, a 2000 video game
- Rally Fusion: Race of Champions, a 2002 video game

== See also ==
- International Race of Champions, North American auto racing competition
