= Vortex (Amiga video game) =

1989 video game

- Developer(s): Visionary Design Technologies
- Publisher(s): Visionary Design Technologies
- Platform(s): Amiga
- Release: November 1989

Vortex is a 1989 video game for the Amiga. The game is similar to the game Ebonstar.

== Gameplay ==
The player must keep anything from entering the swirling vortex in the middle of the screen, using a mouse to control movement and avoid walls.

== Development ==
The game was developed by Visionary Design Technologies (VDT for short) a company based in Canada that was founded by Randy Linden. It was announced in May 1989. The title was written by Andy Hook who also worked on Datastorm, a game that was also developed by VDT.

== Reception ==
Reception

Review scores
Publication	Score
Amiga Joker	66%
Amiga Computing	69%
Amiga Magazine	55%

Juris Graney for the Australian Commodore and Amiga Review said "Overall the game is great. Sound effects and music are tastefully done and the graphics are excellent. If you, like me, are getting a little tired of the continuous line of look-alike punch-em-ups and shoot-em-ups that are being paraded to us, then Vortex may be just what you are looking for"
