= Final Stretch =

Final Stretch may refer to:

- Final Stretch (video game), a 1993 racing video game
- "Final Stretch" (Porridge), an episode of the BBC sitcom Porridge
- A series of postseason games added to the 2021 season of Triple-A (baseball) in the United States
