= NEC μPD7720 =

Fixed point digital signal processors from NEC

The NEC μPD7720 is the name of fixed point digital signal processors from NEC (currently Renesas Electronics). Announced in 1980, it became, along with the Texas Instruments TMS32010, one of the most popular DSPs of its day.

== Background ==
In the late 1970s, telephone engineers were attempting to create technology with sufficient performance to enable digital touch-tone dialing. Existing digital signal processing solutions required over a hundred chips and consumed significant amounts of power. Intel responded to this potential market by introducing the Intel 2920, an integrated processor that, while it had both digital-to-analog and analog-to-digital converters, lacked additional features (such as a hardware multiplier) that would be found in later processors. Announcements for the first "real" DSPs, the NEC μPD7720 and the Bell Labs DSP-1 chip, occurred the following year at the 1980 IEEE International Solid-State Circuits conference. The μPD7720 first became available in 1981 and commercially available in late 1982 at a cost of ¥20.000 (around $82 and inflation corrected for 2023 dollars around $304). Beyond their initial use in telephony, these processors found applications in disk drive and graphics controllers, speech synthesis and modems.

== Architecture ==
Detailed descriptions of the μPD7720 architecture are found in Chance (1990), Sweitzer (1984) and Simpson (1984). Briefly, the NEC μPD7720 runs at 4 MHz frequency with 128-word 16-bit data RAM, 512-word 13-bit data ROM, and 512-word 23-bit program memory, which has VLIW-like instruction format, enabling all of ALU operation, address register increment/decrement operation, and move operation in one cycle. The stack area, which is distinct from the main memory address space, is allocated in a separate address space. The stack, utilized during subroutine calls and interrupts, has a depth of four.

== Variants ==
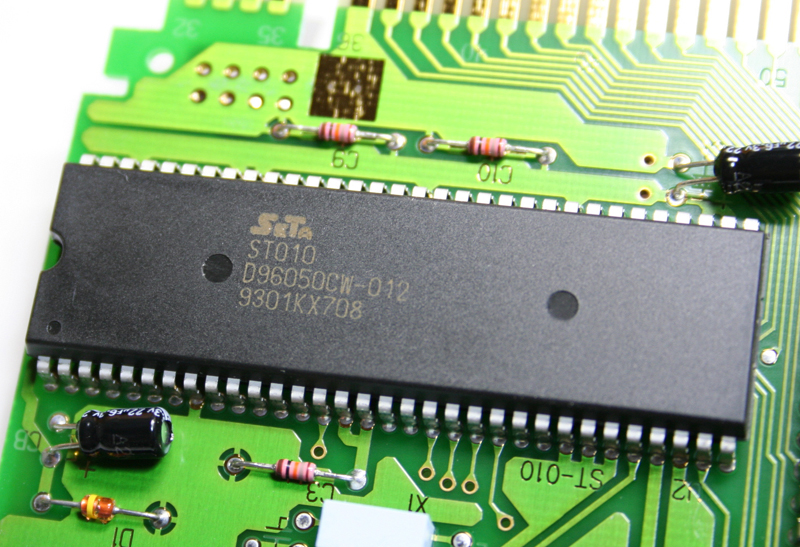
The successor NEC μPD96050

The NEC μPD77C25, which succeeded the μPD7720, runs at 8 MHz frequency with 256-word 16-bit data RAM, 1,024-word 16-bit data ROM, and 2,048-word 24-bit program memory. The stack, utilized during subroutine calls and interrupts, maintains the same depth of four as that of the μPD7720.
NEC μPD77C25 was succeeded by backwards compatible μPD96050 which runs at either 10 or 15 MHz frequency with 2,048 16-bit data RAM, 2,048-word 16-bit data ROM, and 16,384-word 24-bit program memory. Compared to its predecessor, call stack has been expanded to depth of 8, instruction set includes some additional instructions and it supports battery backup for data RAM.
Both μPD77C25 (DSP-1, DSP-2, DSP-3, DSP-4) and μPD96050 (ST010, ST011) were used as enhancement coprocessors in Super NES game cartridges.
