= Bike Daisuki! Hashiriya Kon – Rider's Spirits =

1994 video game

- Developer(s): Genki
- Publisher(s): Masaya
- Platform(s): Super Famicom
- Release: JP: September 30, 1994
- Genre(s): Racing
- Mode(s): Single-player, multiplayer

Bike Daisuki! Hashiriya Kon - Rider's Spirits (バイク大好き！走り屋魂; lit. "I Love Bikes! Race Ya Soul") is a 1994 video game for the Super Famicom. It is a racing game that allows players to race on motorcycles.

== Gameplay ==
Gameplay screenshot

The bottom of the screen can serve two purposes in the game. In single-player mode, it can show the map race or it can show a simulated rearview mirror showing action behind the player. Like a real bike, it shows two rear-view mirrors.

There are eight characters with four types of characters. Each of the four character types has its attributes for speed, handling, acceleration.

Tracks in the game include various attributes such as ice, dirt, asphalt, and cobble-stone.

"Chicken Race" is a mode in the game where the player goes down a ramp and must stop as close to the edge without going over. Going over results in wrecking the motorbike.

It is possible to play in two or four player mode.

There are items when going through a "pit-stop" on the track and the racing itself is complex, with drifts and wheelies. The player can choose from eight characters of various appearances and has a fuel gauge to watch while playing the game. Two views are present; a first-person view through the motorcycle rear-view mirrors and a second view using a more conventional third-person view. Other than the number of laps and the lap time, all other information is in Japanese.

== Development ==
The game uses the DSP-1 chip, which is the same chip used by Super Mario Kart. The DSP chip provides fast support for the floating point and trigonometric calculations needed by 3D math algorithms.

== Release ==
The game was released on September 30, 1994 in Japan for the Super Famicom, and was published by Masaya. The game remained exclusive to Japan until a 2019 re-release, which features an English translation.

== Reception ==
Reception

Review scores
Publication	Score
Famitsu	26/40
Video Games	74%
Mega Fun	89%
CVG	82/100

Previews and reviews for the game noted the resemblance between Rider's Spirits and Super Mario Kart. Mega Fun went so far as to call the game a "Mario Kart Clone". EGM said it wasn't a Super Mario Kart sequel, but it "may as well be". Both EGM and Super Console noted that aside from using motorcycles the games are very similar.

Upon release, four reviews for Famitsu gave the game a score of 24/40. It scored 74% in Video Games, 89% in Mega Fun, and 82% in CVG.

== See also ==
- Hashiriya
