= Tengai Makyō Zero =

1995 video game

- Japanese SFC box art
- Developer: Red Company
- Publisher: Hudson Soft
- Director: Shinichi Nakata
- Designer: Kōji Arai
- Series: Tengai Makyō
- Platform: Super Famicom
- Release: JP: December 22, 1995
- Genre: Role-playing
- Mode: Single-player

Tengai Makyō Zero (天外魔境(てんがいまきょう)ゼロ) is a 1995 role-playing video game developed by Red Company and published by Hudson Soft for the Super Famicom. The game was released exclusively in Japan on December 22, 1995, and is an installment in the Tengai Makyō series.

== Gameplay ==
A screenshot of Lost Templar's work-in-progress translation of the game

Tengai Makyō Zero is a turn-based role-playing game, featuring random battles. Battles are fought from an over-the-shoulder perspective, similar to games like Phantasy Star II and Phantasy Star IV: The End of the Millennium. The battle system itself is more akin to the Dragon Quest series of games, with a special twist: unlike previous games in the series, the player does not learn new techniques via leveling up, but must instead seek out the hidden "hermits", which teach new techniques or elemental abilities.

Tengai Makyō Zero was one of the few Super Famicom games to make use of the SPC7110, a data decompression chip that allows for more data to be stored on a cartridge than a typical Super Famicom game. As a result, the game includes a large variety of music, a large amount of text dialogue, and no repetition of enemy sprites whatsoever. The game also makes use of a real-time clock accessed via the SPC7110, which, much like recent games in the Animal Crossing and Pokémon series, results in different special events in the game taking place depending on the time of day, and even the time of year.

== Synopsis ==
=== Plot ===
In the feudal Japan-like world of Jipang, an evil prince releases the demon lord Ninigi, who in turn seals the gods of Jipang and suppresses the people of six kingdoms with his demon henchmen. After one of the henchmen attack his village and slay his grandfather, the main character, Higan, learns he is the legendary "Fire Hero" and must set off to save the kingdoms. Along the way, Higan meets several characters, such as Subaru, a fairy and Tenjin, a swordsman.

=== Characters ===
==== Heroes ====
- Higan (ヒガン)

The hero of the game and is a descendant of the Fire Clan. The clan descended from the heavenly land of Takamagahara six hundred years ago during the war to defeat Ninigi, the ruler of Hell. After receiving a divine revelation from the Eternal Flame, he set out to defeat Hell's army.

- Subaru (スバル)

She is a fire fairy, which are born every twenty years. Since she has just been born, everything she seems rare and extremely interesting. She has a pure heart, and says whatever she is feeling at the time. She is so innocent that she cannot tell the difference between friends and foes, so she speaks to everyone as if they were the same.

- Tenjin (テンジン)

This warrior of the Fire Clan descended from the Heavens during the war that took place six hundred years ago. Tenjin is a skilled swordsman with many techniques at his disposal. He acts as though he hates human beings. During conversations, he always asks a series of questions to see what is in someone's heart.

- Mizuki (みずき)

She is one of the hellspawn, but it seems she lent a hand to the Fire Clan six hundred years ago. Why she has joined Higan and the others is entirely unclear, as many mysteries still remain about her.

- Hisui (ヒスイ)

She is another fire fairy who serves the Fire Clan, is Subaru's older sister. She wields a mysterious gift; she is able to bring the villagers' rusted tools back to their former gleam. At 20 years old, she is approaching the end of a fairy's lifespan. She will be reborn as Subaru in Yumedono, the Palace of Dreams.

- Genkotsu & Binta (ゲンコ & ビンタ)

These are Higan's friends who live in Fireshadow Village. They are always tagging along with Higan, but they are cowards who end up bailing on him when the going gets tough.

==== Divine Beasts ====
- Fire Bear (火熊, Hikuma)

The guardian of justice. This divine beast watches over the Fire Bear Nation.

- Peacock (孔雀, Kujaku)

The guardian of health. This divine beast watches over the Peacock Nation.

- Crane (鶴, Tsuru)

The guardian of purity. This divine beast watches over the Crane Nation.

- Turtle (亀, Kame)

The guardian of love. This divine beast watches over the Turtle Nation.

- Canine God (犬神, Inukami)

The guardian of friendship. This divine beast watches over the Canine Nation.

- Dragon (竜, Ryū)

The leader of Jipang's six divine beast watches over the Dragon Kingdom.

==== Hell's Army ====
- Ninigi (ニニギ)

Hell's army operates under the command of Niniji, the ruler of Hell. There are five commanding officers.

- Zettai Reido (絶対レイド)

In charge of the first squadron.

- Doki (地獄の赤丸, Jigoku no Akamaru)

The raging ogre.

- Sara (サラ)

- Juri (ジュリ)

- Kingin (キンギン)

==== Other ====
- Akamaru (赤丸)

This mysterious man has an odd accent. He often appears before Higan and the others to offer advice. He is an affable man who always keeps himself informed. He seems to be a merchant by trade, but his motivations appear unclear.

- Kabuki (カブキ)

== Development and Release ==
=== Tengai Makyō Zero: Shōnen Jump no Shou ===
Tengai Makyō Zero: Shōnen Jump no Shou (天外魔境ゼロ : 少年ジャンプの章) is a special promotional version of the game, tied in with the Weekly Shōnen Jump magazine. Though it seemingly has very few differences from the original game (such as the title screen), the game is extremely rare and is quite possibly the most expensive Super Famicom game. Equally rare is the promotional clock in the style of the game cartridge to promote the use of the Real Time Clock (RTC) in-game. They removed one building and event from the original game. In one of the towns, they replaced it with the Kodansha office. This version adds an additional character and item that does not exist in the original.

=== Translations ===
Tengai Makyō Zero was never officially localized into western languages and attempts at fan-translation were stalled due to difficulties caused by the game's script size and bugs in the hardware graphics decompressor. In October 2017, an English fan translation was released.

== Reception ==
Reception

Review score
Publication	Score
Famitsu	29/40

Famitsu gave Tengai Makyō Zero a score of 29 out of 40. Hardcore Gaming 101's Kurt Kalata called it a quality installment in the Tengai Makyō series, praising its graphics as some of the best on the Super Famicom.
