= Dirt Racer =

1995 video game

- Cover art
- Developer: MotiveTime
- Publisher: Elite Systems
- Platform: Super NES
- Release: EU: May 1995
- Genre: Offroad/rally driving
- Mode: Single-player

Dirt Racer is a Europe-exclusive video game for the Super Nintendo Entertainment System developed by British studio MotiveTime and released in 1995. This game uses the Super FX powered GSU-1 to provide enhanced graphics.

== Gameplay ==
Gameplay screenshot

Players must drive their dirt track racing vehicle across a road rally. The car comes complete with a speedometer (in kilometres), a lap counter, and a lap time counter. There are a pre-determined number of chances to complete the game, like in Super Mario Kart and F-Zero. If the player is unable to defeat the game in those number of tries, then the player gets an automatic game over. A yellow smiley face shows up to track the performance of the driver. If it's smiling, then the player is winning. Otherwise, the player is losing the game.

== Development and release ==
Dirt Racer was developed by British studio MotiveTime. It was the second racing game using Super FX technology simultaneously developed under publisher Elite Systems, the other being the unreleased PowerSlide. Elite Systems director and co-founder Steve Wilcox recounted, "PowerSlide was intended to be an authentic, track-based simulation whilst Dirt Racer was intended to be an off-road romp with benefits, those benefits including real-world vehicle dynamics."

Dirt Racer programmer Chris Nash and graphic artist Adam Batham stated that development began in September 1993 after they dissected and analyzed the cartridge for Star Fox. They claimed that the updated iteration of the Super FX allowed them to use twice as many polygons as in Star Fox. Unlike the racing game Stunt Race FX, Dirt Racer did not allow to change the viewing perspective because the designers saw it as a needless waste of memory. Elite Systems development manager Trevor Williams explained that the game's race courses were generated on a "square mesh" which could be raised or lowered to create variable terrain. The game's computer AI-controlled opponents were programmed to dynamically adjust to the skill level of the player so that even beginners stand a chance of winning.

The completed version of Dirt Racer featured less complex visuals than what was previewed in magazines. For instance, sprites were ultimately used for the wheels, similar to Stunt Race FX. Dirt Racer was released exclusively in Europe starting in May 1995. Wilcox shouldered some of the blame for the game's poor critical reception. It was his decision to exclude "driver aids" which he speculated would have mitigated its difficult vehicle controls. In 2018, Elite Systems had considered giving Dirt Racer a limited physical re-release with improvements alongside a finished version of PowerSlide.

== Reception ==
Reception

Review scores
Publication	Score
Consoles +	80%
Computer and Video Games	80/100
GamesMaster	21%
Joypad	89%
M! Games	68%
Mega Fun	15%
Official Nintendo Magazine	47/100
Player One	55%
Super Play	51%
Total!	30% (UK); 5 (DE)
Video Games (DE)	20%
Play Time	15%
Power Unlimited	4.3/10
Super Gamer	95/100
Ultra Player	3/6

Dirt Racer received largely negative reviews from print publications during its release including 51% from Super Play, 30% from Total!, and 21% from GamesMaster.
