= F1 ROC II: Race of Champions =

1993 video game

Exhaust Heat II F1 ROC II: Race of Champions
- North American cover art
- Developer: SETA
- Publisher: SETA
- Designer: Mitsuhiro Takeda
- Composers: Masanao Akahori; H.Nakayama
- Series: Exhaust Heat
- Platform: Super Nintendo Entertainment System
- Release: JP: March 5, 1993; NA: July 1994
- Genre: Racing
- Mode: Single-player

F1 ROC II: Race of Champions, originally released in Japan as Exhaust Heat II (エキゾースト・ヒートII), is a 1993 racing video game developed and published by SETA Corporation for the Super Nintendo Entertainment System. It is the sequel to F1 ROC: Race of Champions, and similarly features Formula One licensing. Unlike that game, F1 ROC II was not released in Europe.

== Gameplay ==
Moon City, the first track of F1 ROC II.

Gameplay is mostly like the first F1 ROC, though this game features a new system of handling that greatly resembles later F-ZERO games; normal turning is 'ice'-like, and tapping the accelerator (referred to as 'boost turning' in F-ZERO) corrects the vehicle.

The game's career structure is no longer simply a Formula One season, and is now similar to games like the PC Engine version of F1 Dream or Formula One: Built to Win; starting from smaller local races, one progresses through the Group C division, Formula 3000, and finally Formula One.

Once the player reaches the Formula One part, things change. First, they must choose one of three teams: Footwork, Larrousse, and Benetton. Second, the season's tracks must be done in order, instead of being able to choose or even re-race a track like in the earlier divisions. Third, this part uses a season standings system in addition to keeping the times of individual races; the object of the game changes from simply winning the races to acquiring as many points as possible in order to win the championship. Finally, the game becomes more punishing: hitting obstacles, frequent usage of the pit stop, and other careless mistakes will destroy championship hopes just like in the real Formula One.

== Development ==
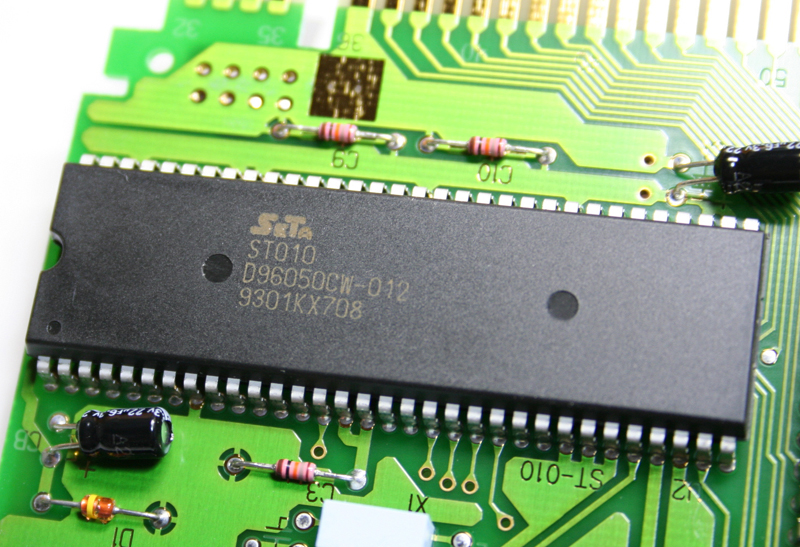
The ST-0010.

The hardware of F1 ROC II features the ST010 (also known as the NEC μPD96050) DSP chip, which is used for general functions and for handling the intelligence of the computer cars. The chip presumably allowed computer-controlled drivers to perform realistically aggressive maneuvers, emulating the speed and accuracy of real Formula One drivers, considered a rarity at the time.

However, the chip's program ROM was eventually extracted, where it was found that only a fraction of the chip's space was used for these specific instructions, and that the algorithms themselves were relatively simple.

== Reception ==
GamePro acknowledged F1 ROC II's large amount of content, smooth control, and the innovative mechanics fueled by the game's custom DSP chip, but rated the overall game as "only above-average", citing poor sound effects and a lack of detail in the car graphics.
