= Final Stretch (video game) =

1993 video game

- Cover art featuring Footwork Mugen Honda
- Developer: Genki
- Publisher: LOZC G. Amusements
- Composer: Masanao Akahori
- Platform: Super Famicom
- Release: JP: November 12, 1993
- Genre: Racing
- Modes: Single-player; Multiplayer

Final Stretch (ファイナル・ストレッチ) is a 1993 Japan-exclusive Super Famicom Formula One racing video game licensed by FOCA to Fuji Television, which is based on the 1993 Formula One season.

The game was supervised by Aguri Suzuki and can be considered as the sequel to Aguri Suzuki F-1 Super Driving. It features a DSP-1 chip. In single-player mode, there is a split screen and the player is given five views to choose from (top view, side view, turn view, camera view and back view), while controlling the car in the typical chase view. There are up to five laps on a given race and speeds can reach an average of 328 kilometres per hour (204 mph).

== Reception ==
On release, Famicom Tsūshin scored the game a 24 out of 40.
