= F1 ROC: Race of Champions =

1992 video game

Exhaust Heat F1 ROC: Race of Champions
- North American box art
- Developer: SETA
- Publishers: JP/NA: SETA; EU: Ocean Software
- Programmer: Tetsuo Mochizuki
- Composer: Masanao Akahori (Opus Corp.)
- Series: F1 ROC
- Platform: Super Nintendo Entertainment System
- Release: JP: 21 February 1992; NA: September 1992; EU: 1992
- Genre: Racing
- Mode: Single-player

F1 ROC: Race of Champions, released in Japan and Europe as Exhaust Heat (エキゾースト・ヒート), is a 1992 racing video game developed by SETA Corporation for the Super Nintendo Entertainment System.

The following year, the game was followed up with F1 ROC II: Race of Champions.

== Gameplay ==
This is a screenshot of a typical game. The player shown here is competing at the Canadian Grand Prix that took place at the Circuit Gilles Villeneuve in Montreal, Quebec, Canada.

There are sixteen open wheel racing tracks in the game; all of them correspond to the 1992 Formula One season, with races all over the Earth. Realistic looking advertisements are present where the audience sits, complete with near-perfect spelling of sponsors; this mild level of censorship applies because some of the sponsors are tobacco or alcohol-related. The game uses the Super Famicom's Mode 7 to give the track and background perspective.

Players have a limited amount of money to modify their race car before having to qualify and eventually try to win the race. Modifications must be purchased out of the player's pocket as if they were a driver/owner. As with F1 rules at the time, no refueling is possible; pit stops are only used to fix damage on the automobile. Post-race damage penalties will occur if the player finished the race with a damaged vehicle. Even a minor dent can be expensive to a rookie because of the high level of precision by the mechanics. Total damage can and will force the player to retire from the race. The player can choose to hide stats such as position in the race (in order to have an unobstructed view of the backgrounds).

== Reception ==
Reception

Aggregate score
Aggregator	Score
GameRankings	65.33% (3 reviews)

Review scores
Publication	Score
Famitsu	26/40
Mean Machines	91%

In an import review for Mean Machines, Julian Rignall cited Exhaust Heat as "one of the most rewarding, enjoyable and long-lasting racing games around", although he noted that "there no trackside obstacles and the game has a rather sparse and empty feel about it." Radion Automatic also praised the game, writing that "[e]ven non-race fans will be converted by this stunning release." Writers for Famitsu called Exhaust Heat an "easy type of F-Zero".

== See also ==
- F1 Pole Position (video game)
