= Super Nintendo Entertainment System Game Pak =

Cartridges for the Super Nintendo Entertainment System

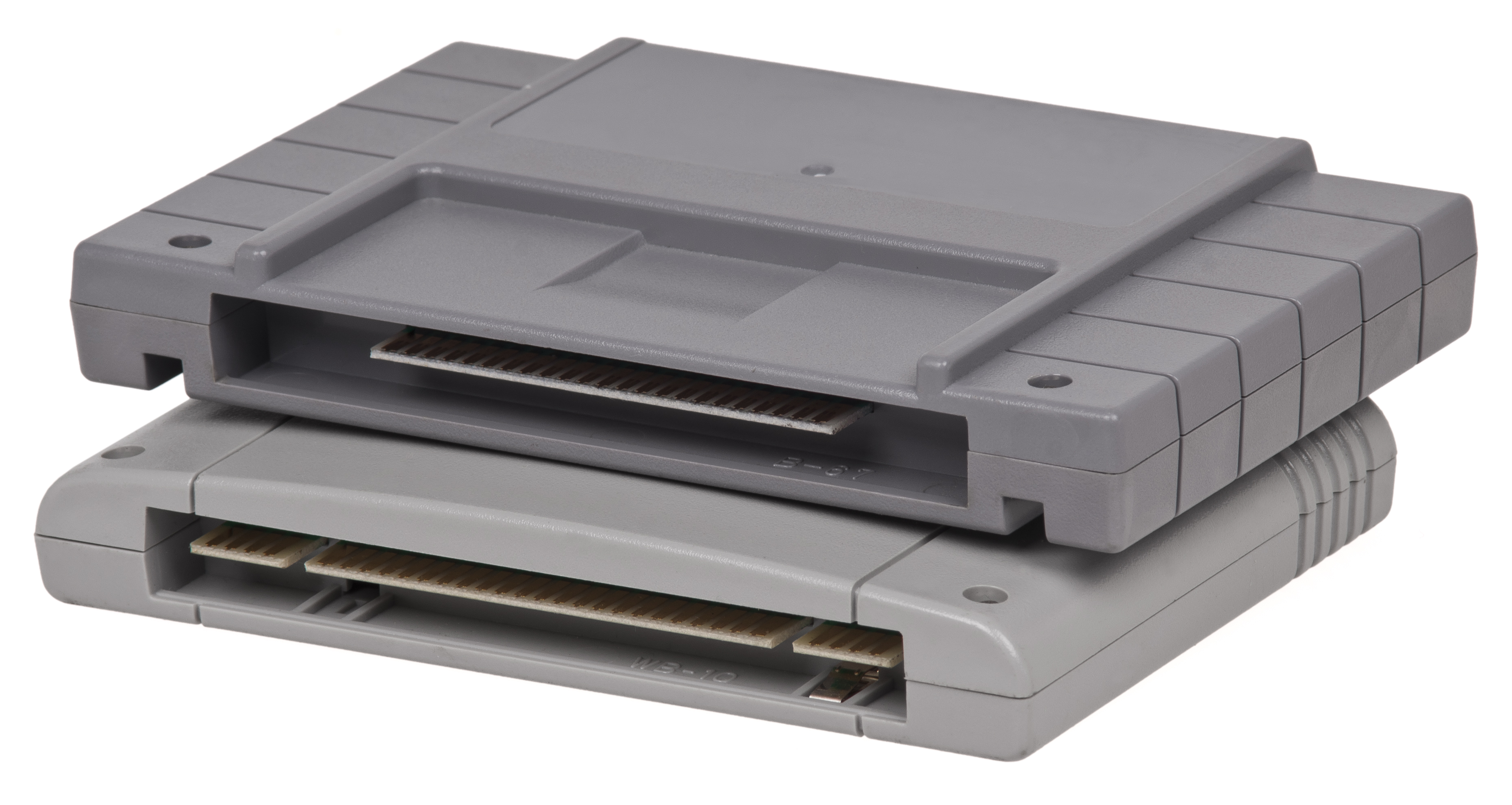
- The North American (top) Super NES Game Pak, and the Japanese (bottom) Super Famicom Cassette. The case designs of the PAL region Game Pak and Japanese Cassette are nearly identical.
- Media type: ROM cartridge
- Encoding: Digital
- Capacity: 2–48 Mbit
- Developed by: Nintendo
- Dimensions: NTSC: 3.45 in (88 mm) high × 5.35 in (136 mm) wide × 0.78 in (20 mm) thick; PAL/JP: 3.39 in (86 mm) high × 5 in (130 mm) wide × 0.79 in (20 mm) thick
- Usage: Super Nintendo Entertainment System

The Super Nintendo Entertainment System Game Pak is the system's default ROM cartridge medium. It is called Game Pak in most Western regions, and Cassette (カセット, Kasetto) in Japan and parts of Latin America. While the Super NES can address 128 Megabits, (Note: Unless otherwise specified, kilobyte (kB), megabyte (MB), and megabit (Mbit) are used in the binary sense in this article, referring to quantities of 1024 or 1,048,576.) only 117.75 Megabits are actually available for cartridge use. A fairly normal mapping can easily address up to 95 Megabit of ROM data (63 Megabits at FastROM speed) with 8 Megabits of battery-backed RAM. However, most available memory access controllers only support mappings of up to 32 Megabits. The largest games released (Tales of Phantasia and Star Ocean) contain 48 Megabits of ROM data, while the smallest games contain 2 Megabits.

Cartridges may also contain battery-backed SRAM to save the game state, extra working RAM, custom coprocessors, or any other hardware that will not exceed the maximum current rating of the console.

== Enhancement chips ==
As part of the overall plan for the Super NES, rather than include an expensive CPU that would still become obsolete in a few years, the hardware designers made it easy to interface special coprocessor chips to the console (just like the MMC chips used for most NES games). This is most often characterized by 16 additional pins on the cartridge card edge.

The Super FX is a RISC CPU designed to perform functions that the main CPU could not feasibly do. The chip was primarily used to create 3D game worlds made with polygons, texture mapping and light source shading. The chip could also be used to enhance 2D games with effects such as sprite scaling and rotation.

The Nintendo fixed-point digital signal processor (DSP) chip allows for fast vector-based calculations, bitmap conversions, both 2D and 3D coordinate transformations, and other functions. Four revisions of the chip exist, each physically identical but with different microcode. The DSP-1 version, including the later 1A and 1B bug fix revisions, is most popular; the DSP-2, DSP-3, and DSP-4 are in only one game each.

Similar to the 5A22 CPU in the console, the SA-1 chip contains a 65c816 processor core clocked at 10 MHz, a memory mapper, DMA, decompression and bitplane conversion circuitry, several programmable timers, and CIC region lockout functionality.

In Japan, games could be downloaded for a fee from Nintendo Power kiosks onto special cartridges containing flash memory and a MegaChips MX15001TFC chip. The chip managed communication with the kiosks to download ROM images, and provided an initial menu to select which of the downloaded games would be played. Some games were available both in cartridge and download form, while others were download only. The service was discontinued on February 8, 2007.

Many cartridges contain other enhancement chips, most of which were created for use by a single company in a few games; the only limitations are the speed of the Super NES itself to transfer data from the chip and the current limit of the console.

== Design change ==
The cartridge locking mechanism in North American versions of the system is only present in earlier reversions. After the locking mechanism was removed, North American cartridges were redesigned to defeat the locking mechanisms in older consoles. Cartridges with the newer design started appearing in 1993, though depending on the date of production, some games are available with both cartridge styles. Super Mario All-Stars and most later releases were only made in the newer-design cartridge.
