= AT&T DSP1 =

Digital signal processor

The AT&T DSP1 was a pioneering digital signal processor (DSP) created by Bell Labs.

The DSP1 started in 1977 with a Bell Labs study that recommended creating a large-scale integrated circuit for digital signal processing. It described a basic DSP architecture with multiplier/accumulator, addressing unit, and control; the I/O, data, and control memories were planned to be off-chip until large-scale integration could make a single chip implementation feasible.

The DSP1 specification was completed in 1978, with first samples tested in May 1979. This first implementation was a single-chip DSP, containing all functional elements found in today's DSPs including multiplier–accumulator (MAC), parallel addressing unit, control, control memory, data memory, and I/O. It was designed with a 20-bit fixed point data format, and 16-bit coefficients and instructions, implemented in a 4.5 micrometre DRAM process technology.

By October 1979 other Bell Labs groups began development using the DSP1, most notably as a key component in AT&T's 5ESS switch.
