= Dirt Trax FX =

1995 video game

- North American cover art
- Developer: Sculptured Software
- Publisher: Acclaim Entertainment
- Platform: Super NES
- Release: NA: June 1995; PAL: 1995
- Genre: Racing
- Modes: Single-player, multiplayer

Dirt Trax FX is a racing video game developed by Sculptured Software and released by Acclaim Entertainment for the Super Nintendo Entertainment System in 1995. The 3D graphics of the game were made possible by the Super FX powered GSU-1, which was built into the cartridge.

== Gameplay ==
Gameplay screenshot.

The player can choose between eight different riders with unique characteristics and four bikes ranging from 50cc to 500cc. There are 22 tracks with four difficulty levels of gameplay.

The game allows two players to play simultaneously.

== Release ==
In October 2018, the game's rights were acquired by Canadian production company Liquid Media Group along with other titles originally owned by Acclaim Entertainment.

== Reception ==
Reception

Review scores
| Publication | Score |
|---|---|
| GameFan | 80/100, 88/100, 85/100 |
| GamesMaster | 71/100 |
| Joypad | 55% |
| M! Games | 59% |
| Mega Fun | 78% |
| Official Nintendo Magazine | 90/100 |
| Super Play | 77% |
| Total! | (UK) 68/100, (DE) 2 |
| Video Games (DE) | 78% |
| Fun Generation | 8/10 |
| VideoGames | 7/10 |

Dirt Trax FX received generally favorable reception from critics. GameFan's reviewers praised its smooth 3D presentation, fluid movement, and addictive gameplay, while GamePro said its easy handling made it fun but less realistic.
