= Datastorm =

1989 shooter video game

- Developer: Visionary Design Technologies
- Publisher: Visionary Design Technologies
- Programmer: Søren Grønbech
- Composer: Timm Engels
- Platform: Amiga
- Release: NA: 1989
- Genre: Scrolling shooter
- Modes: Single-player, multiplayer

Datastorm is a horizontally scrolling shooter for the Amiga published by Visionary Design in 1989. Written by Søren Grønbech, it was inspired by the Defender arcade video game and the Defender-like Dropzone originally released for Atari 8-bit computers.

== Gameplay ==
Datastorm allows for a single player to play or two players to play simultaneously or one after the other. The game takes place on planets in a side scrolling format that wraps around with the player flying above in a spacecraft. The player must protect and rescue the eight survival pods that roll around on the surface of the planet and take them to a warp gate. An onslaught of enemies attempt to attack the spaceship so constantly destroying them and their missiles is necessary. There is also a special type of enemy called an alien lander that captures the pods and whisks them away to the top of the level. In addition to standard enemies, there are also mother ships, which act as bosses within the game. These mother ships come in the form of a fleet of fast luminous ships, a large squid or a large skull.

A radar scanner, which is essentially a mini-map, is presented along the bottom of the screen and gives a complete view of the entire planet to help keep track of what is happening. The game also features an autosave, a highscore table, on-screen instructions and a level select. In terms of weaponry, the ship has lasers, smart bombs and cloaking technology that makes it briefly invincible. The points increase for each level; on levels 5, 9, 13, etc., the player gets a new set of eight pods and the scoring resets.

== Plot ==
The game takes place after the planet Xerxes exploded, causing its eight orbiting colonies to drift into deep space. The inhabitants of these colonies must locate a new home planet, so they each send a survival pod out into space to achieve this mission.

== Release ==
The game was announced in May 1989.

== Reception ==
Reception

Review scores
Publication	Score
ACE	870/1000
Aktueller Software Markt	7/12
Amiga User International	7/10
Commodore User	83%
Computer and Video Games	95%
Génération 4	78%
The Games Machine (Italy)	90%
The One	84%
Tilt	17/20
ACAR	85%
Amiga Magazin	9,7/12
C=lehti	4/5
Info	4.5/5
Power Play	71/100

Datastorm received a generally favorable reception from critics. Computer and Video Games' Julian Rignall called it "the best shoot 'em up yet seen out of a coin-op cabinet".
