= Stunt Race FX =

1994 video game

- North American box art
- Developers: Nintendo EAD; Argonaut Software
- Publisher: Nintendo
- Director: Tatsuya Hishida
- Producer: Shigeru Miyamoto
- Programmers: Giles Goddard; Masato Kimura; Kenji Yamamoto; Colin Reed
- Artists: Tomoaki Kuroume; Naoki Mori; Takaya Imamura
- Composer: Shinobu Amayake
- Platform: Super Nintendo Entertainment System
- Release: JP: June 4, 1994; NA: July 10, 1994; EU: October 27, 1994
- Genre: Arcade racing
- Modes: Single-player, multiplayer

Stunt Race FX, known in Japan as Wild Trax (ワイルドトラックス, Wairudo Torakkusu), is a racing video game developed by Nintendo and Argonaut Software and published by Nintendo for the Super Nintendo Entertainment System. It is the second game to use the 3D-centric Super FX powered GSU-1.

Stunt Race FX was added to the Nintendo Classics service on September 5, 2019, its first re-release in more than two decades.

== Gameplay ==
Stunt Race FX is a racing game with various anthropomorphic vehicles. The player can choose between three vehicles (F-Type is like a Formula One, Coupe is a coupé, and 4WD is a monster truck), a fourth unlockable (2WD), or a fifth in bonus games (Trailer which is a semi-trailer truck). The eyes as headlights was a late-in-development addition. Each vehicle has different capabilities of speed, body, and acceleration. According to the instruction booklets in English, the vehicles are male, but in the Japanese instruction manual and the Japanese television commercial, the Coupe is female and every other vehicle is male.

The game features five modes: three for racing levels, one for obstacle courses, one for test-driving, one for time-attacking, and one for multiplayer racing.

During gameplay, vehicles can use various functions to their advantage; the speed can be boosted, L and R buttons make sharper turns, and vehicles are damaged by collisions.

The capabilities of the Super FX chip are demonstrated extensively. Each course is constructed of 3D polygons, complete with road bumps, overhead passes, and detailed billboard advertisements. The lack of speed is incorporated into gameplay by featuring cars that are heavier and clumsier than in conventional racing games.

== Development ==
In 1991, Nintendo and Argonaut Software began developing a custom 3D cartridge chip called the Super FX chip to enable create polygonal 3D graphics on the Super NES. The primary goal was what became Star Fox, but during the Super FX's development, Nintendo and Argonaut experimented with general 3D game development. The development of Stunt Race FX, which was tentatively titled as FX Trax back then, started when Giles Goddard and Colin Reed joined in and later became Nintendo employees.

Wataru Yamaguchi created the clay models of vehicles on the Japanese version's box art and the instruction booklet of all versions.

3D polygonal graphics are the game's main highlight, and producer Shigeru Miyamoto had his designers emphasize realistic vehicle dynamics. For instance, the F-Type's center of gravity is set at the rear of its body. The direction, weight, and force applied by each tire to the road surface is unique, making it quicker and easier for the car's tail to drift when cornering compared to other vehicles. Miyamoto stated that the player could notice these more subtle details by mastering each vehicle.

In early development, the 2WD vehicle was not a part of the car roster. In its place was a three-wheeled vehicle called the 3WD, bearing a color scheme very close to the 4WD's blue paint job.

== Marketing ==
Two television advertisements were made and aired: one for Japan and one for North America and Europe. The Japanese advertisement is a short Japanese animation showing the vehicles in action along with gameplay footage. It is narrated by Akira Kamiya. The advertisement for North America and Europe has a police officer talking to the viewers (as the driver) who he thinks infracted traffic laws while some gameplay footage is shown.

Around the release of Stunt Race FX in the United States, Nintendo of America contracted with Kellogg's to give away a promotional, Hot Wheels brand, F-Type race car to people who mailed two proofs of purchase of Apple Jacks breakfast cereal.

== Reception ==
Reception

Aggregate score
| Aggregator | Score |
|---|---|
| GameRankings | 86.25% |

Review scores
| Publication | Score |
|---|---|
| Computer and Video Games | 91/100 |
| Edge | 9/10 |
| Electronic Gaming Monthly | 7/10, 7/10, 6/10, 6/10, 7/10 |
| Famitsu | 8/10, 9/10, 8/10, 7/10 |
| Game Informer | 8/10 |
| Game Players | 90% |
| GameFan | 88/100, 86/100, 90/100 |
| GamesMaster | 94/100 |
| Hyper | 92% |
| Nintendo Power | 4/5 |
| Official Nintendo Magazine | 95/100 |
| Super Play | 93% |
| Total! | (UK) 94%, (DE) 2+ |
| Digital Press | 8/10 |
| Game Zero Magazine | 94.0/100 |
| Games World | 90/100 |
| Nintendo Magazine System | 95/100 |
| Super Gamer | 94/100 |

According to Famitsu, Stunt Race FX sold 46,372 copies in its first week on the market and 161,995 copies during its lifetime in Japan. In 1998, PC Zone reported that the game's sales had surpassed one million copies, making it one of the best-selling SNES games. The Japanese publication Micom BASIC Magazine ranked it fifth in popularity in its September 1994 issue, and it received a 22.1/30 score in a readers' poll conducted by Super Famicom Magazine. The game received generally favorable reception from critics, holding a rating of 86.25% based on four reviews according to review aggregator GameRankings.

Game Zero Magazine's four reviewers proclaimed that the controls were "out of this world" and the "attention to detail is truly superior". Edge deemed it "one of the best racing games currently available for any home system". Nintendo Power complemented the game's intuitive controls, high quality graphics and gameplay depth while suggesting players that the stunts are not the "daredevil stuff you might expect" and that the player may find themselves disoriented after crashing. Electronic Gaming Monthly's five editors felt that Stunt Race FX is a disappointment after the first Super FX game, Star Fox, because "the game feels awkward with the touchy steering and the feeling of speed just isn't there. Overall, there are better racing games on the market". GamePro's Captain Squideo said the game is not realistic but it "still delivers a good time, especially if you're not old enough to drive".

IGN ranked the game 86th in its Top 100 SNES games of All Time. In 2018, Complex rated it 90th on its "The Best Super Nintendo Games of All Time". In 1995, Total! ranked it 21st on its list of Top 100 SNES Games. They praised the game's graphics saying it was significantly better than Star Fox writing: "It's very different from your run-of-the-mill race game and manages to offer a wide range of challenges."

Zoey Handley of Destructoid said the game's contemporary reviews are mostly positive but biased by the simple standards of the time, and that as a child she considered it good only as a rental because its replay value is so short and the primitive graphics induce nausea. She said the Super FX empowers the Super NES to "[punch] above its generational weight class" but called this game one of the chip's lesser technology demonstrations. "It looks like the [game development] team had a lot of fun challenging themselves to see what they could squeeze out of the tech, but it's not necessarily that much fun to play. Yet, somehow, it has just enough personality to feel distinctly Super Nintendo."
