= SNCF Class Z 23500 =

Class of 80 French electric multiple unit trains

SNCF Z 23500
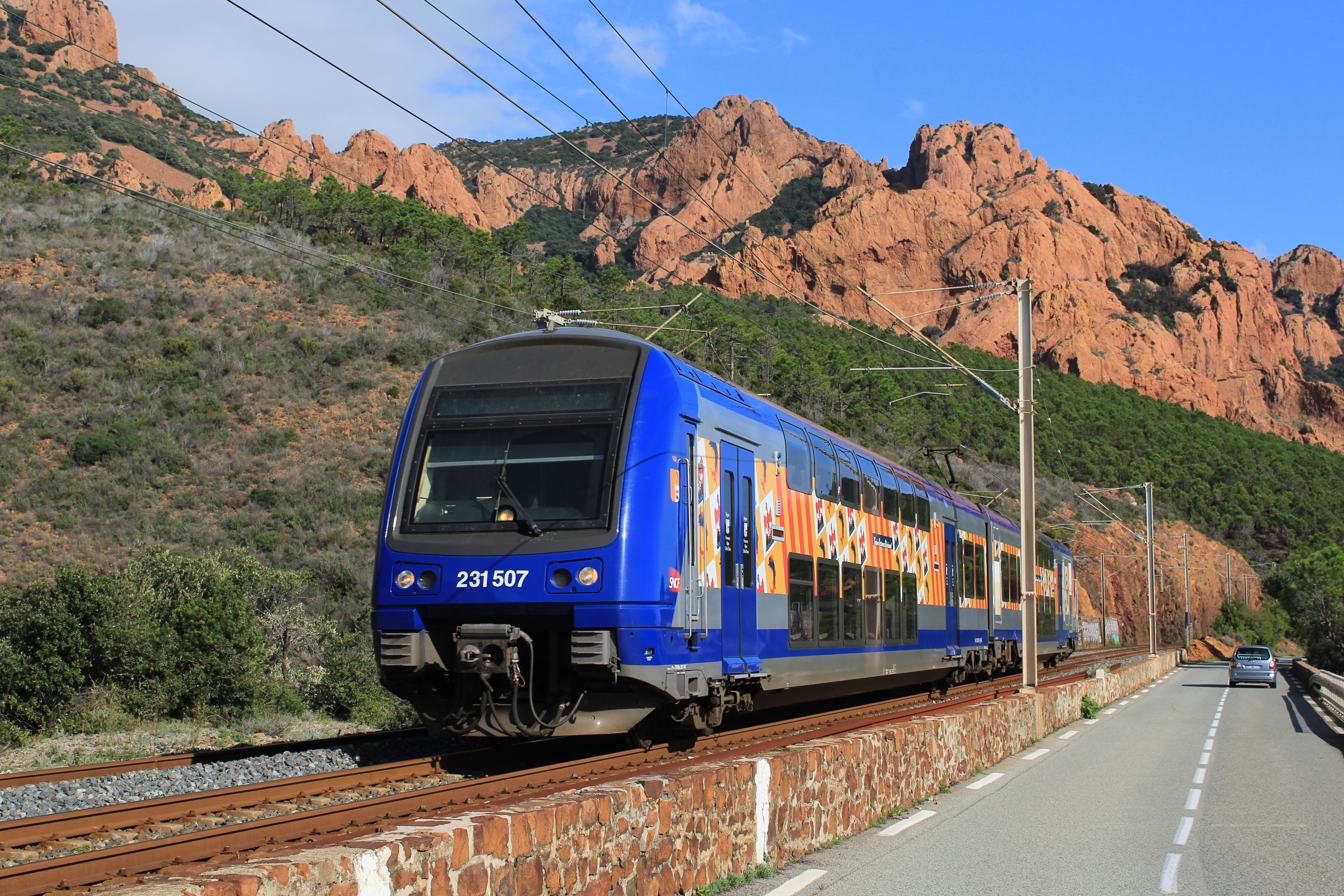
- A SNCF Class Z 23500 in the Massif de l'Esterel on the Marseille-Ventimiglia railway in France which connects to the Italian Genoa–Ventimiglia railway.
- In service: 1997 – present
- Manufacturer: GEC-Alsthom and ANF (later Bombardier, now merged with Alstom)
- Family name: TER2N (Train Express Régional à 2 niveaux)
- Number built: 80 trainsets (160 cars)
- Formation: 2-car sets
- Capacity: 19 (1st class); 155 (2nd class); 8 (standing)
- Operators: SNCF TER PACA, TER Nord-Pas-de-Calais, TER Rhône-Alpes
- Depots: Marseille-Blancarde (TER PACA); Lille (TER Nord-Pas-de-Calais); Lyon-Vénissieux (TER Rhône-Alpes)

Specifications
- Car body construction: stainless steel
- Train length: 52.5 m (172 ft 2 7/8 in)
- Width: 2.82 m (9 ft 3 1/32 in)
- Height: 4.32 m (14 ft 2 3/32 in)
- Maximum speed: 140 km/h (87 mph)
- Weight: 124 tonnes (122.0 long tons; 136.7 short tons)
- Traction system: IGBT-VVVF (Alstom OniX 1500)
- Traction motors: 4 × Alstom FXA 2858 425 kW (570 hp) 3-phase AC induction motor
- Power output: 1.7 MW (2,280 hp)
- Electric system(s): Overhead line: 25 kV 50 Hz AC; 1,500 V DC
- Current collector(s): Pantograph type Ax
- Braking system(s): Electrodynamic
- Safety system(s): Crocodile, KVB.
- Coupling system: Scharfenberg type
- Track gauge: 1,435 mm (4 ft 8 1/2 in)

The Class Z23500 also called TER 2N (TER 2 Niveaux) is a class of double-deck electric multiple units operated in France. They were built by GEC-Alstom and Ateliers du Nord de la France, (which became Bombardier) for SNCF and are used on the TER Network. These sets consist of 2 double deck coaches. They were built from 1997 and a total of 80 units were built. The units were ordered by the following regions: Provence-Alpes-Côte d'Azur, Nord-Pas-de-Calais and Rhône-Alpes. They are mainly used on stopping services around the French Riviera (Provence-Alpes-Côte d'Azur), Lille (Nord-Pas-de-Calais) and Lyon (Rhône-Alpes). They use the TER livery of their regions, e. g. the trains of Rhône-Alpes have a light blue livery.

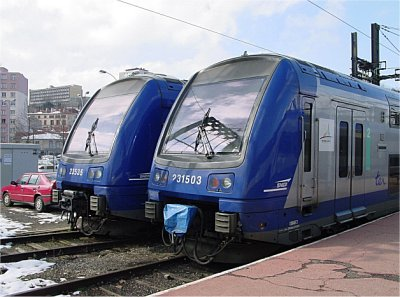
Two Z 23500's at Saint Etienne.

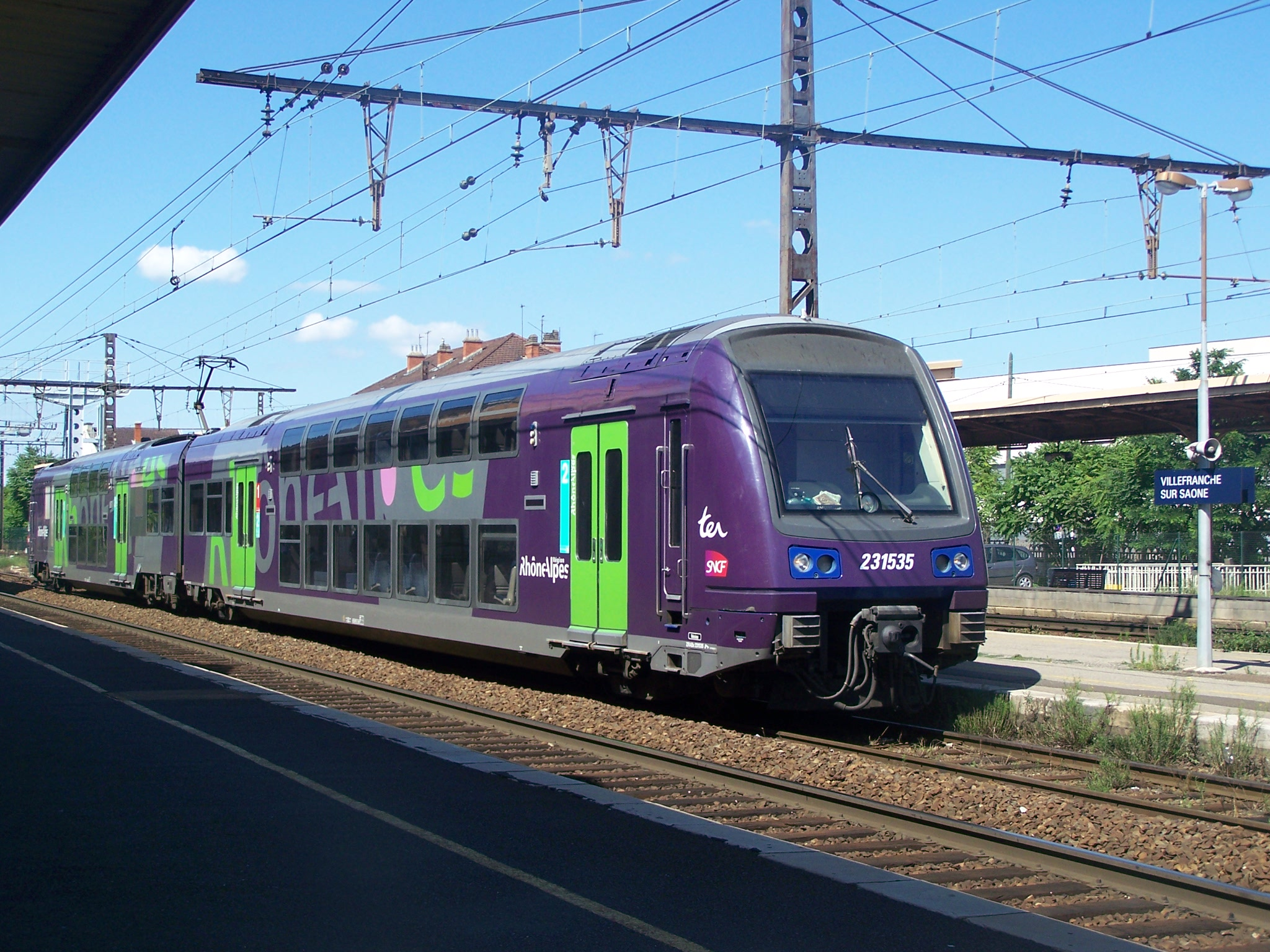
A Rhone-Alpes liveried set at Villefranche sur Saône.

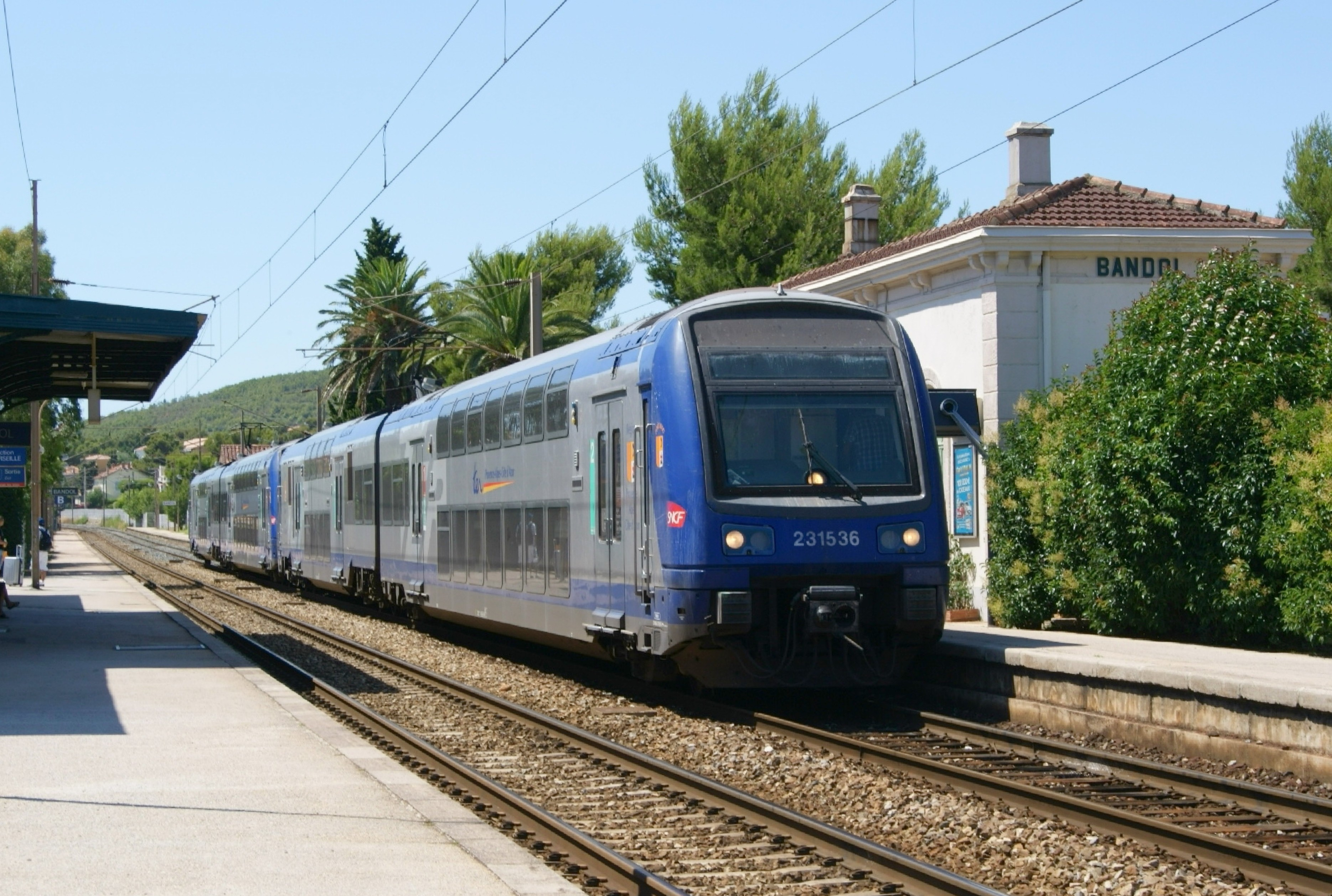
A TER PACA SNCF Class Z 23500 in Bandol on the Marseille-Ventmiglia railway line.

== History ==
During the 80's, Nord-Pas-de-Calais noticed massive growth of regional frequentation. The region ordered a first set of 6 Class Z 92050 in 1994 technically identical to Class Z 20500 to cope this situation. The Class Z 92050 offer a better power performance in comparison of tracted VO 2N and a satisfying capacity. Rhône-Alpes and PACA was also interested about the Z 2N series due to the growth of frequentation but wanted better amenagements for long distances. The Z 23500 serie is the first generation of TER 2N séries followed in 2004 by the Z 24500/ Z 26500 series also called TER 2N NG.

Following a tender Nord-Pas-de-Calais, Rhône-Alpes and PACA ordered 80 Z 23500 trainset (160 cars) to GEC-Alsthom and ANF in 1995.

SNCF completed a refurbishment programme of all of its Z 23500 sets in September 2022.

== Design ==
The Class Z 23500 is based on a half 4 cars Z 20500 train with engine and amenagements upgrades. The Z 2N platform was used due to its capacity, and upgrades were introduced like better seats and an IGBT based traction system. Air conditioning was also added to improve comfort.

The original project was designed with a GTO component based traction system but GEC-Alsthom proposed a new traction system based on IGBT component which is called ONIX.

The traction system is based on IGBT components and 3-phase asynchronous motors. The ONIX traction system was tested on a Z 20500 (194 A) train between 1996 and 1997, this train was nicknamed "ADONIX" for «Automotrice Deux niveaux ONIX». This traction system is also use in Class Z 20900 and CP Class CP 3500.

== Delivery ==
The first three pre-series trains ( Z 23501, Z 23502 and Z 23503) were delivered in autumn 1997 for testing. The first series train (Z 23505) entered in service on 15 February 1998.
