= SNCF Class Z 8800 =

Type of double-decker, dual-voltage electric multiple unit trainset

Z 8800
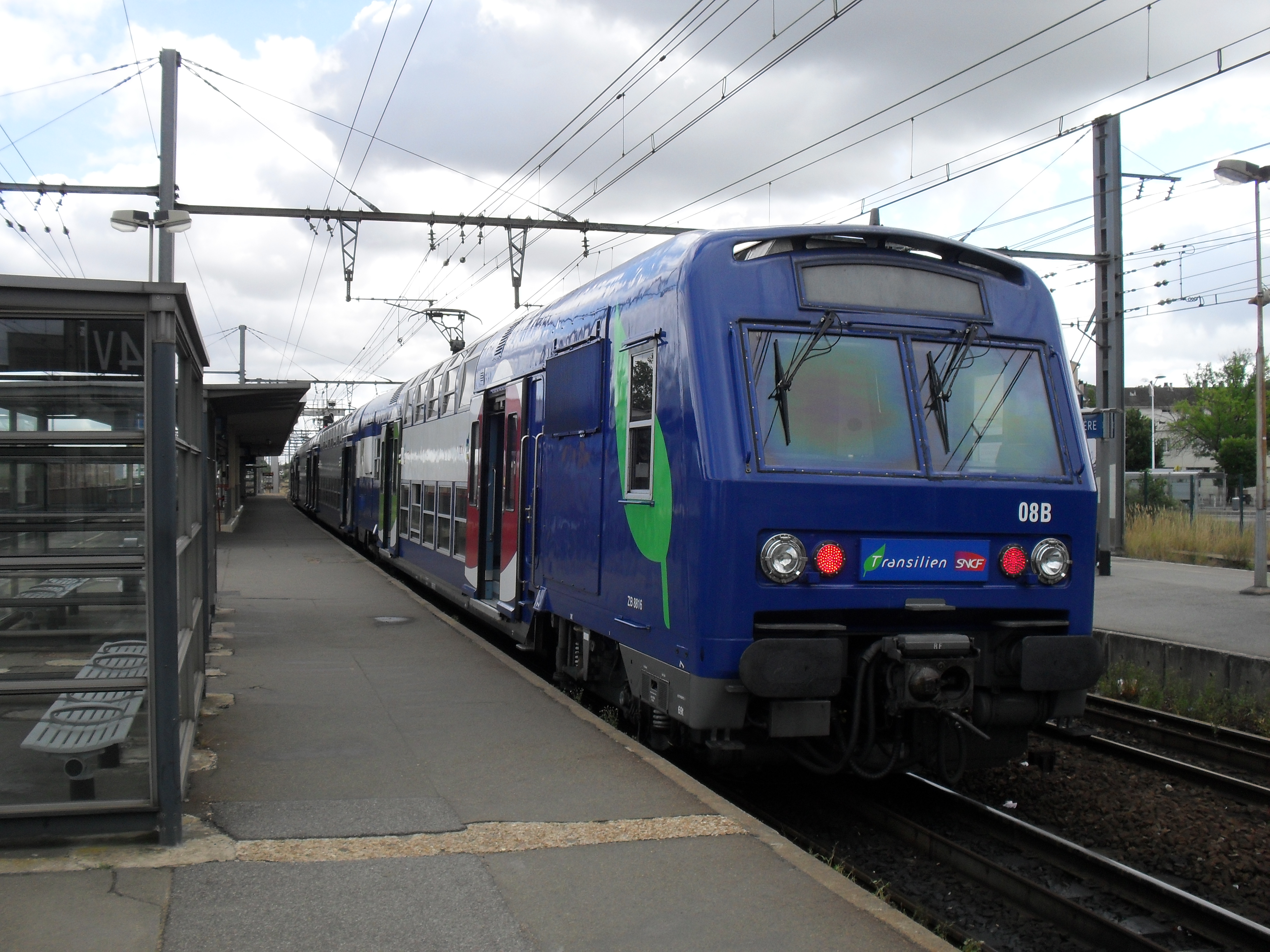
- A Z 8800 trainset operating on Transilien Line U at La Verrière station
- In service: 1985–present
- Manufacturers: ANF, CIMT, and TCO
- Family name: Z 2N series, X'Trapolis Tagus
- Constructed: 1985–1988
- Entered service: 1985
- Refurbished: 2010–2017
- Number built: 58 trainsets (232 cars)
- Number in service: 57 trainsets
- Number scrapped: 1
- Successor: Z57000, Z 2N-NG
- Formation: 4 cars per trainset
- Fleet numbers: Z 8801 to 8916
- Capacity: 907 maximum, 564 seated
- Operators: SNCF (RER and Transilien)
- Depots: Les Ardoines; Trappes
- Line served: RER RER C Transilien Transilien Line N (Paris-Montparnasse) Transilien Line U Transilien Line V

Specifications
- Train length: 98.76 m (324 ft 3/16 in) (4 cars); 147.32 m (483 ft 4 in) (6 cars)
- Width: 2.846 m (9 ft 4 1/16 in)
- Height: 4.32 m (14 ft 2 3/32 in)
- Doors: 2 pairs per side, per car
- Maximum speed: 140 km/h (87 mph)
- Weight: 220,500 kg (486,100 lb)
- Traction system: Diode bridge (only Z8895), chopper and thyristors
- Traction motors: 4 FHO 3262 TCO 750 V DC; 4 FLA 3258 Alsthom 580 V AC (only Z8895)
- Power output: 2,800 kW (3,755 hp)
- Electric systems: Overhead line: 25 kV 50 Hz AC; 1,500 V DC
- Current collection: Pantograph (type AM 67BU)
- Coupling system: Scharfenberg type
- Multiple working: Other Z 2N series trains (Z 5600, Z 8800, Z 20500, Z 20900)
- Track gauge: 1,435 mm (4 ft 8 1/2 in) standard gauge

The SNCF Class Z 8800 is a double-deck, dual-voltage electric multiple unit trainset that are operated by SNCF on the Réseau Express Régional (RER), a hybrid suburban commuter and rapid transit system and the Transilien, a suburban commuter rail system, both serving Paris and its Île-de-France suburbs.

The 58 trainsets were built by a consortium of ANF, CIMT, and TCO between 1985 and 1988

== Description ==
While the Z 5600s had only 1.5 kV DC, SNCF ordered a second series of dual-current 1.5 kV DC / 25 kV AC trainsets for the extension of the RER C to Argenteuil and Montigny-Beauchamp known as connection name "Vallée de Montmorency - Invalides" (VMI). The use of single-phase current implied the addition of a transformer in each motor near the intercirculation, hence the disappearance of two windows at this location on the left side compared to the Z 5600s. the only difference visible to the traveler between the two models.

=== Services operated ===
The Z 8800s were all assigned to the Ardoines workshop to provide service to line C of the Paris RER in 1985. Originally intended for the VMI, some of them however began their career, on line D of the RER, between 1987 and 1988 on the Châtelet - Villiers-le-Bel section. From the opening of the VMI in 1988, they will in reality serve all branches of the RER C, with the exception of the circular service Versailles-Chantiers / Versailles-Rive-Gauche.

Since 1996, the opening of the La Défense - La Verrière line (Line U) has given them the opportunity, with the Z 20500s, to travel to the Transilien Paris Saint-Lazare network. Finally, due to the renovation of the VB 2N trainsets since 2003, some suburban trains to Dreux, Plaisir - Grignon and Mantes-la-Jolie are operated by Z 8800s.Some Z 5300 failures lead to the use of Z 8800s for carry out Paris-Montparnasse - Rambouillet connections.

The Z 8800s were also likely to be engaged on the Saint-Lazare network instead of the Z 20500s, before the arrival of the Z 50000s, to carry out MALA missions to Mantes-la-Jolie or NOPE missions to Nanterre-Université . More rarely, they could also be on the Transilien Paris-Est network by providing MICI missions to Meaux.

Most of the Z 8800 trains are assigned to the Ardoines workshop on line C of the RER network, but can be seen on all Transilien networks in Île-de-France with the exception of the North and South-East suburbs. Since the opening of the Trappes workshop in 2006, eighteen trains have been assigned to it.

In 2016, the Z 8800s can perform any RER C mission, all line U missions (La Défense - La Verrière) and some line N missions (Paris-Montparnasse - Sèvres-Rive-Gauche in duet with VB2N trains, in rush hour and Paris-Montparnasse - Rambouillet in the evening).

== Formations ==
As of 1 January 2022, 57 Z8800 trainsets (01B–58B) are based at the Les Ardoines (RER C) and Trappes (Transilien U) SNCF depots.

As shown below, they are formed with two motored cars and two non-powered (trailer) cars (2M2T).

Line C	← Versailles/Pontoise/St Quentin-en-Yvelines Juvisy/Massy-Palaiseau/Saint-Martin-d'Étampes →			
Line U	← La Défense La Verrière →			
Car No.	1 >	2	3	< 4
Type	Motor	Trailer	Trailer	Motor
Numbering	Z 88xx (odd number)	ZRB 256xx (odd number)	ZRAB 356xx (odd number)	Z 88xx (even number)

- < or > show a pantograph. Cars 1 and 4 are each equipped with one pantograph.
- Car 2 was formerly a mixed 1st class and 2nd class car.

== Fleet ==
The fleet of 57 trainsets is managed by two technical fleet supervisions, "supervisions techniques de flotte"(STF):

- Listing off Z8800 fleet (in French)

The Z 8895 was a prototype of a two-current model with asynchronous motors supplied by thyristor current inverters (1,400 kW, April 1985, returned to type in June 1988).

== Refurbishment ==
Since September 2010, the Z 8800s have been gradually renovated at the Nevers workshops: installation of interior equipment, such as anti-laceration seats with incorporated footrests, similar to the VB 2N Transilien, the on-board passenger information system (SIVE), video surveillance and endowment of a livery almost identical to that of the last Z 20900.

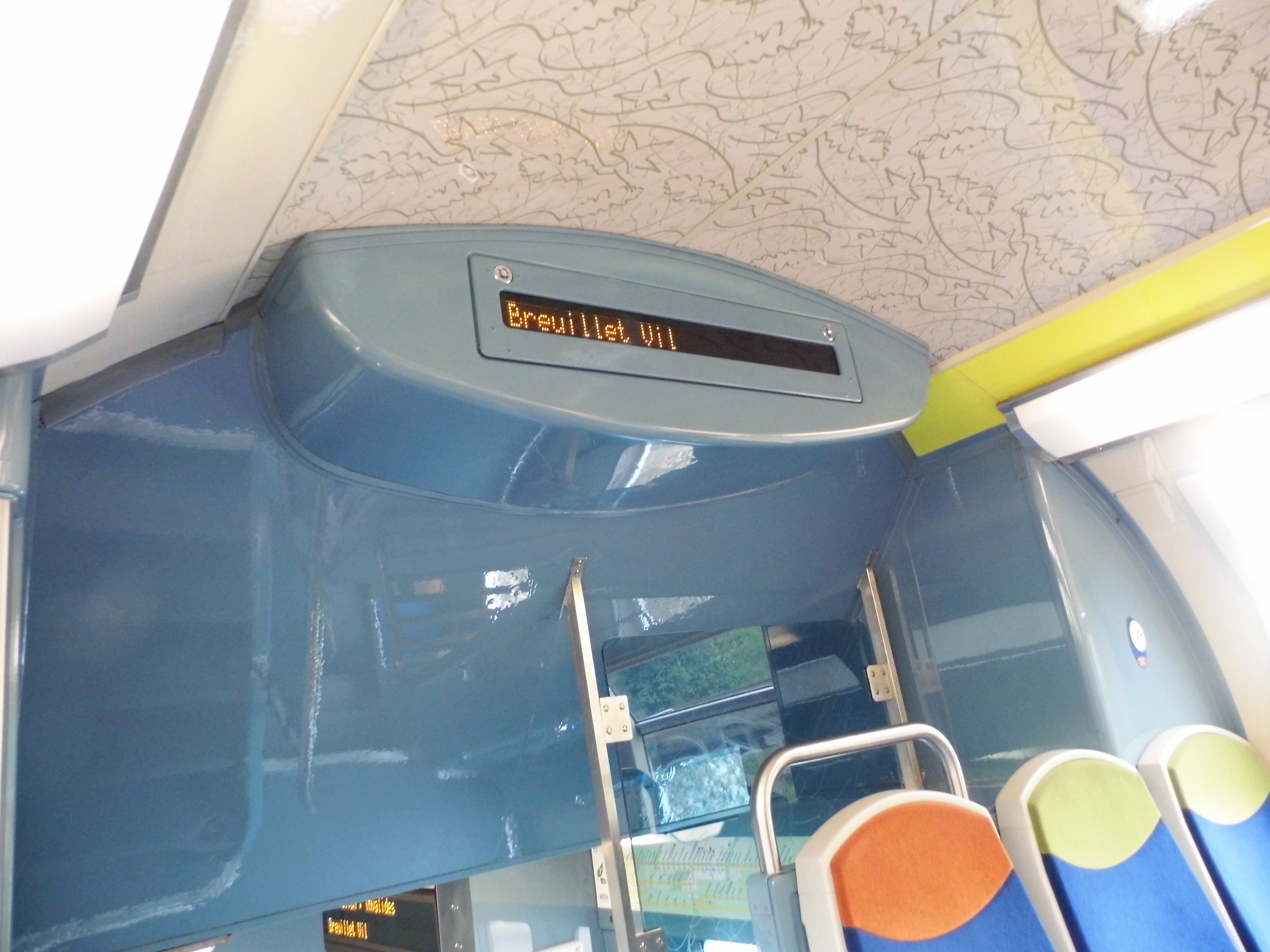
SIVE Passengers information system.

The renovation also consists of removing the folding seats, the interior partitions of the Zrab car from the train, which separates the former first class / second class areas. The removal of the first class seats slightly increases the capacity of the trainsets: configuration 3 + 2 instead of 2 + 2.

Unlike previous renovations (RIO, VB 2N), the Z 8800 will not receive air conditioning. The slight improvement made has also provoked the anger of user associations.

The first renovated train (15 B) has been running since autumn 2010 and the last (07 B) has been running since mid-September 2013 (only Line U trainsets).

RER C trainsets (with the exception of the 20 B train which has been renovated in Transilien livery) will receive the Carmillon livery and different interior colors from the trains in Transilien livery. The first to receive it is the 45 B and the last is the 56 B, returned in March 2017.

Since the start of 2017, the Z 8800 trainsets in Transilien livery, which have not been fitted with the on-board passenger information system or video surveillance, have left for the workshops in Nevers to receive them. As of 11 February 2018 trainsets 10 B, 06 B, 02 B, 16 B, 15 B and 08 B have received this equipment.

== Replacement ==
The trains are to be replaced by cascaded Z 20500 from the RER D, which in turn, will receive new RER NG trains.

== Photo gallery ==
=== Exterior ===
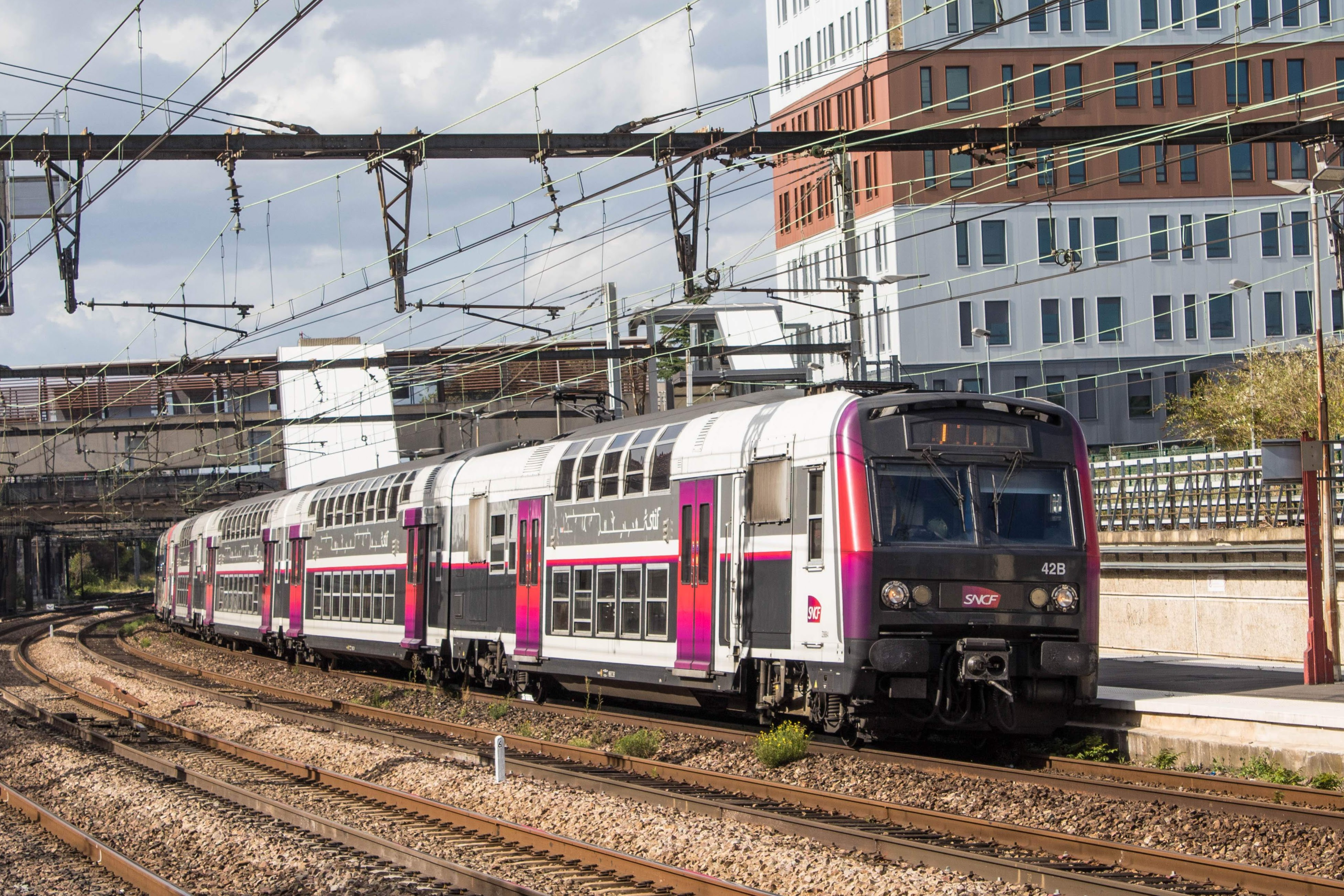
Z 8895 at Choisy le Roi station on RER C Line

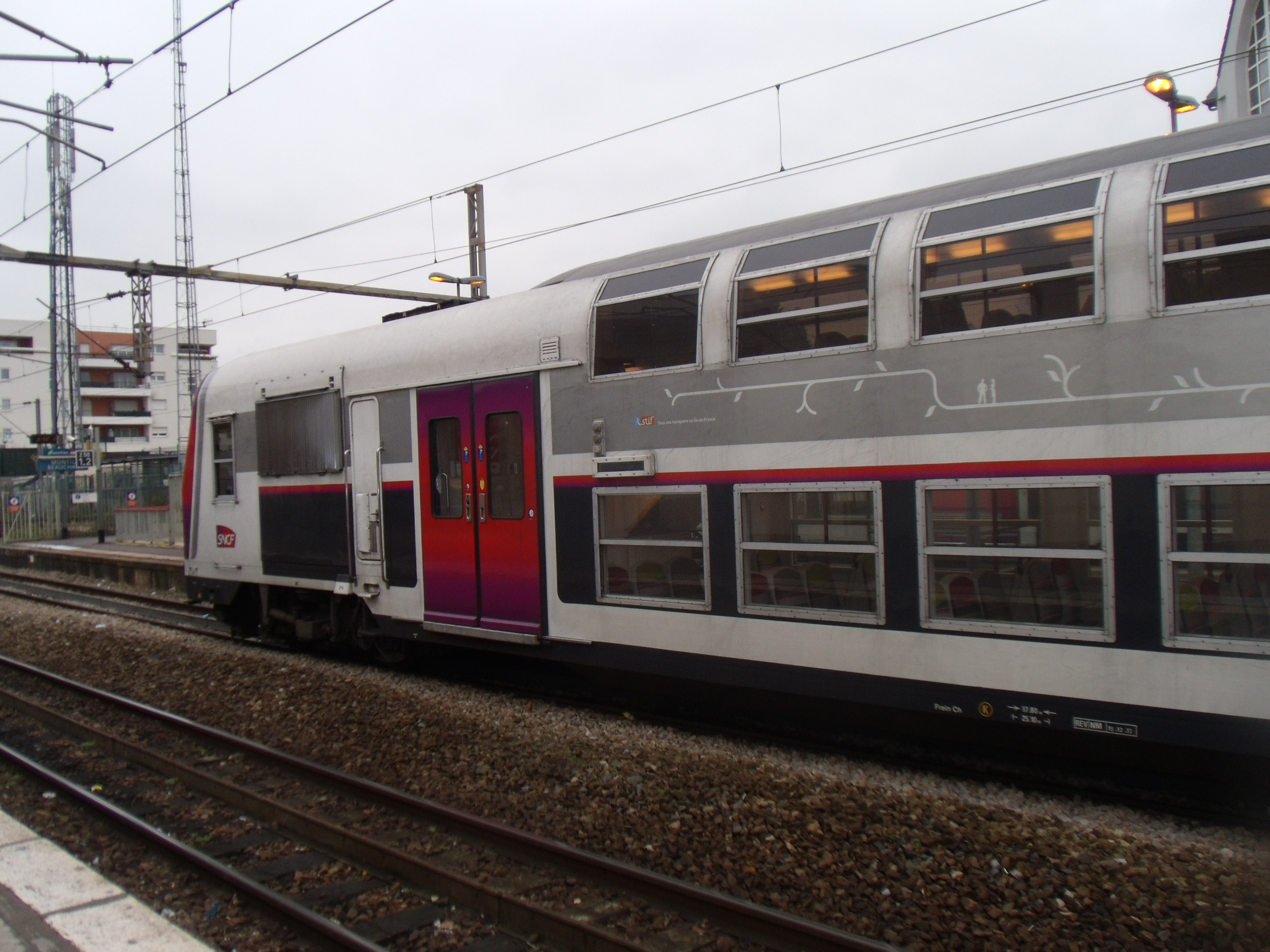
Z8874 (carmillon livrery)

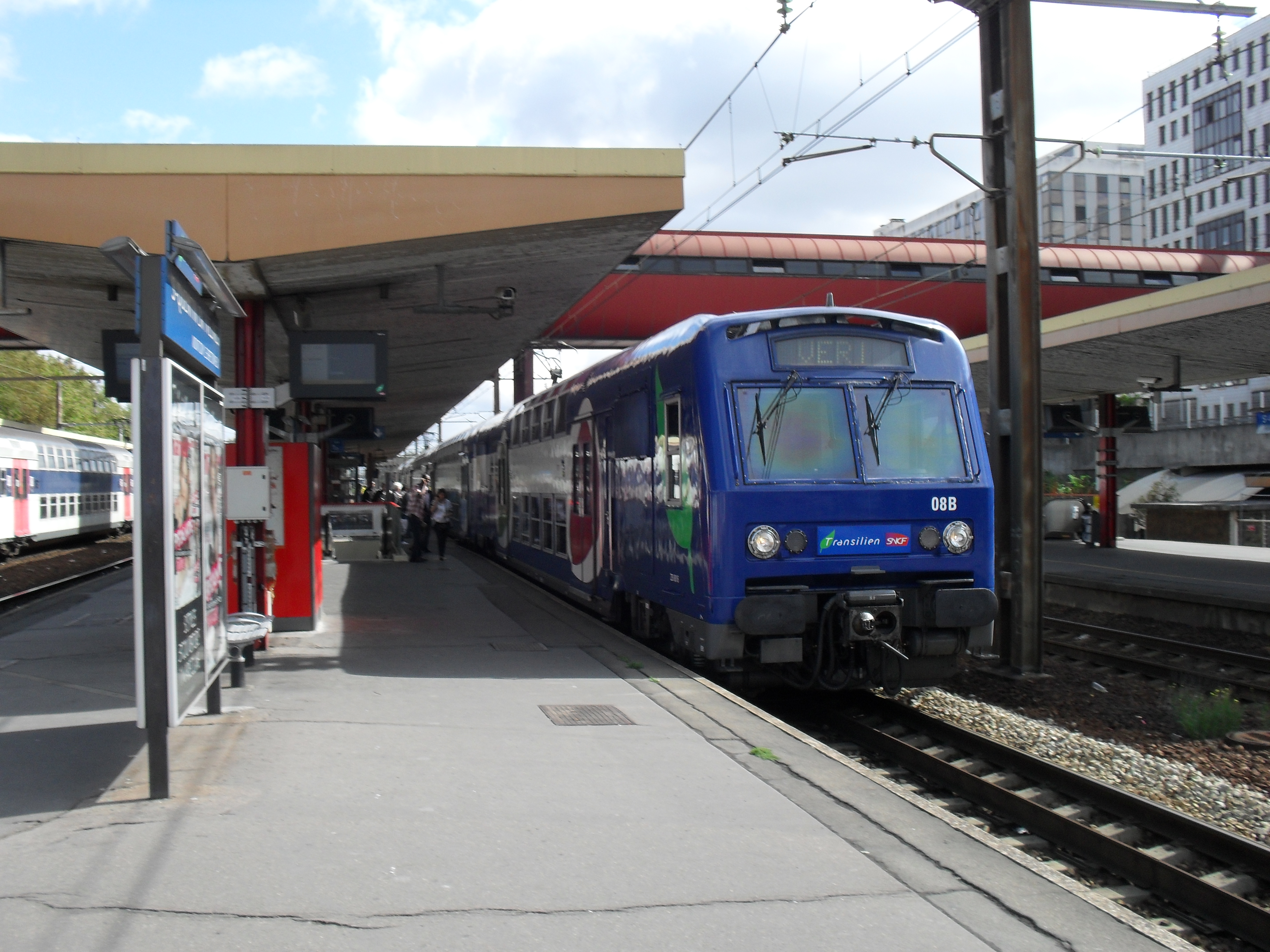
Z8800 at St quentin en Yvelines Station

=== Interior ===
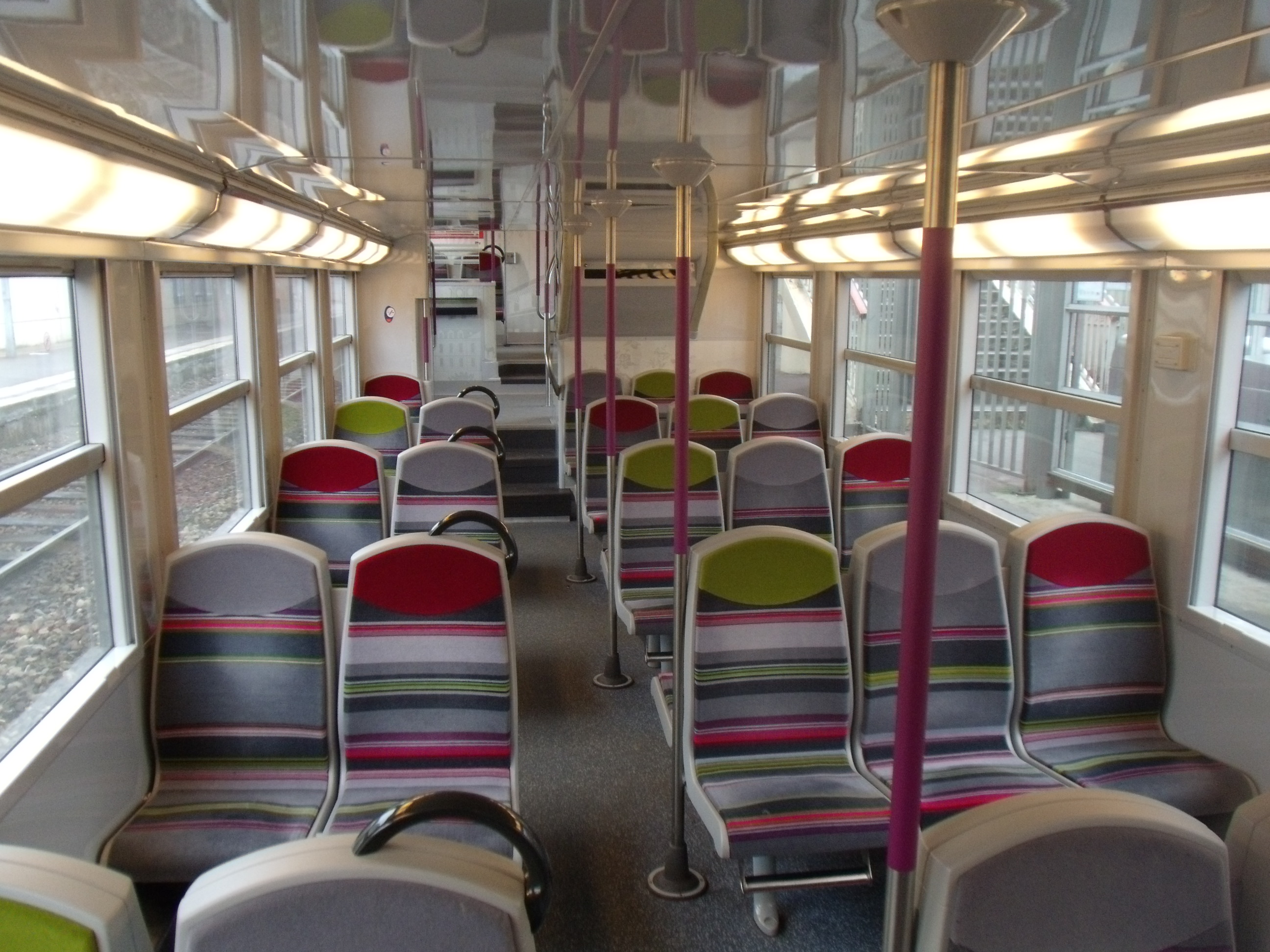
Interior of Z8874 (carmillon livrery)

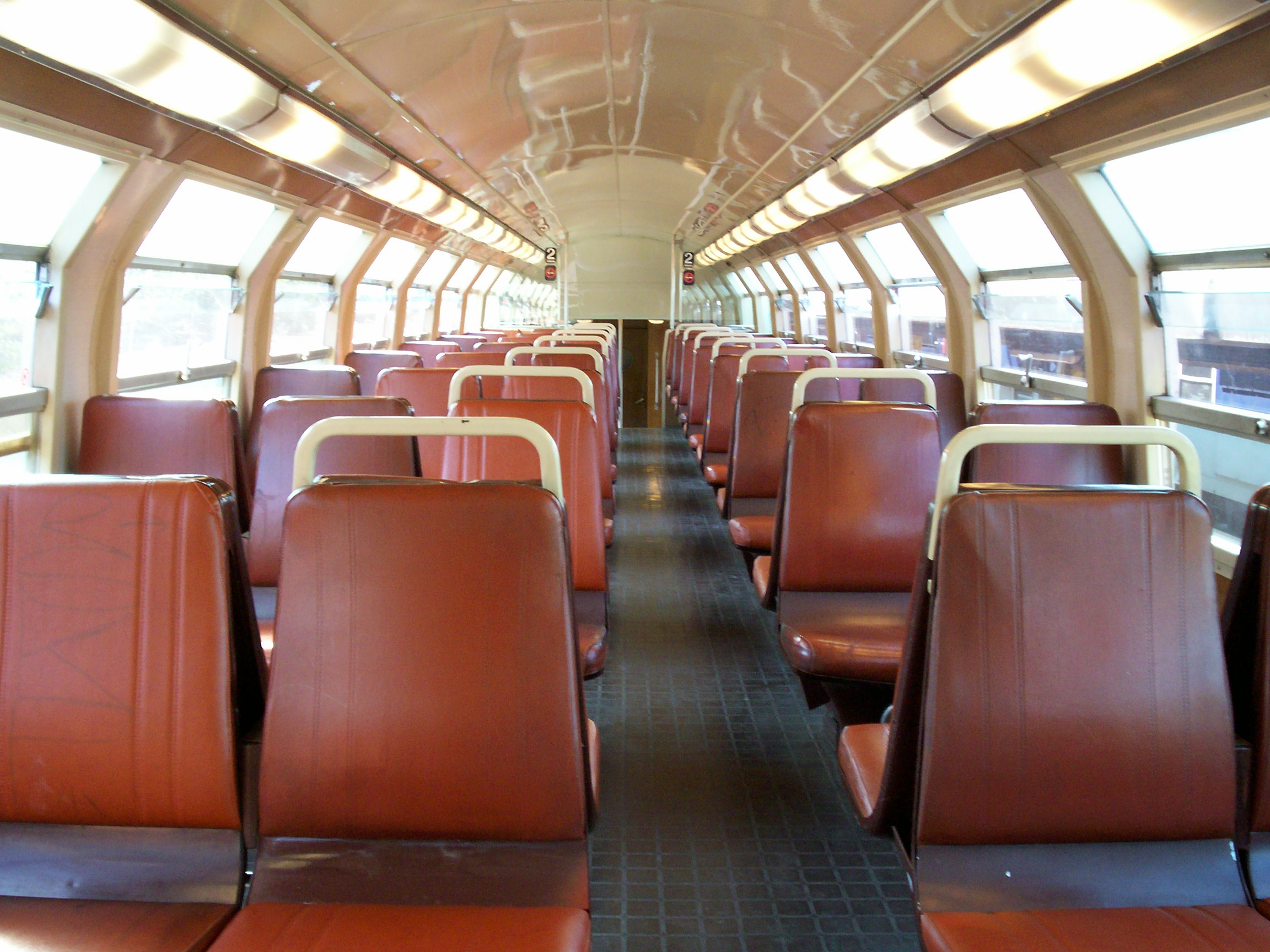
Original Interior with leatherette seat (Skaï)

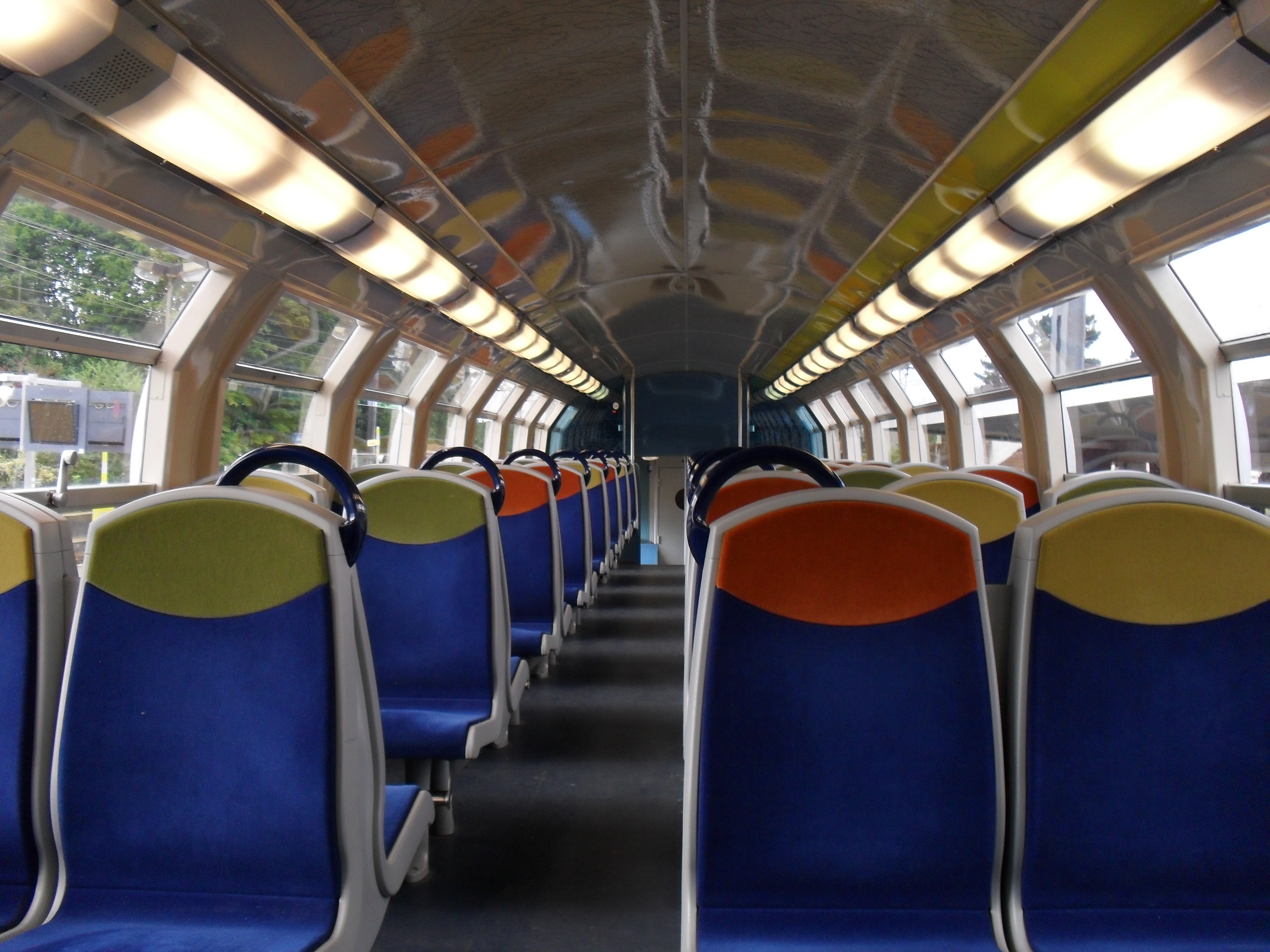
Interior Z8800 (Transilien Livrery)
