= SNCF Class Z 20900 =

Type of double-decker, dual-voltage electric multiple unit trainset

Z 20900
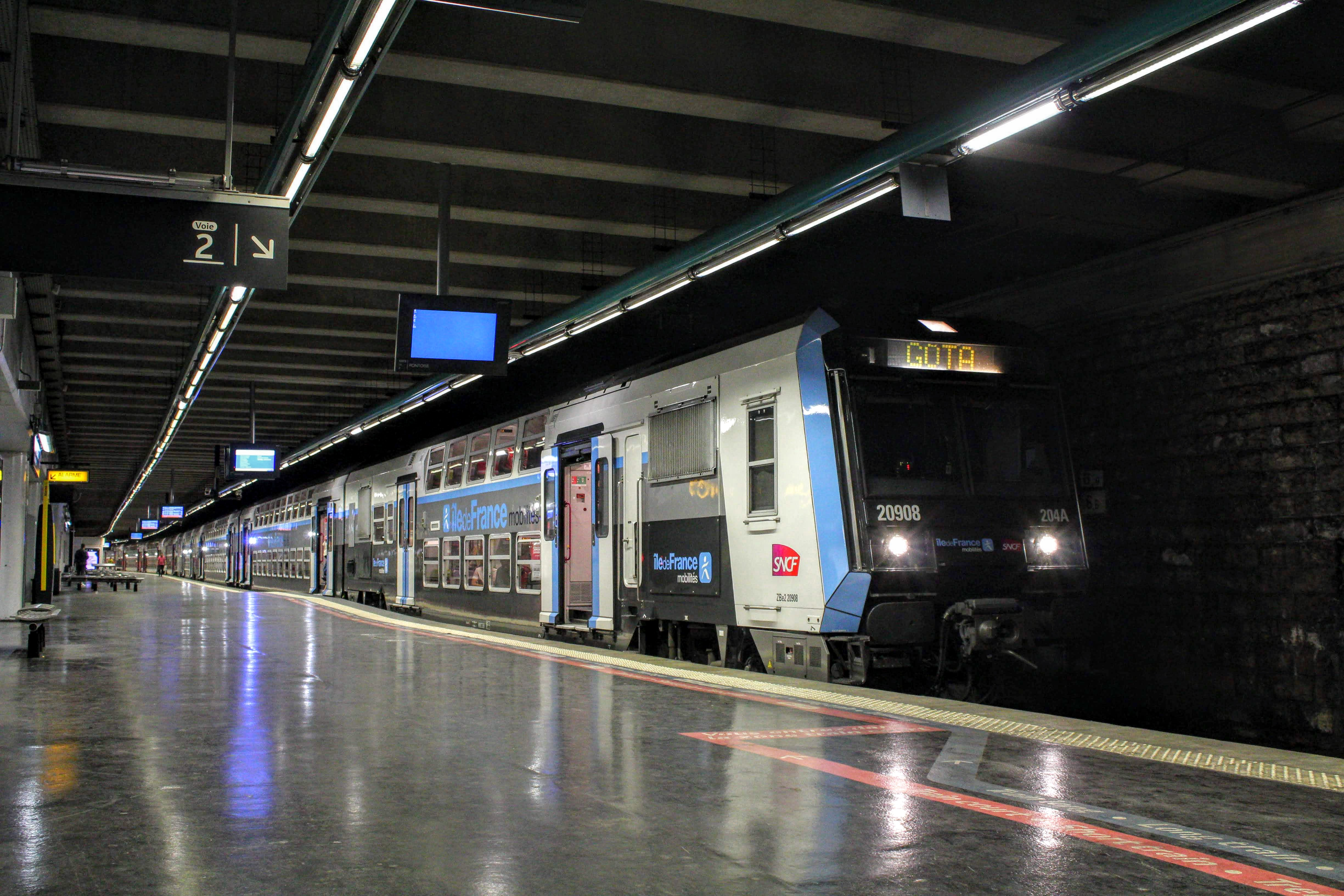
- A Z 20900 trainset operating on the RER C line at Neuilly – Porte Maillot station
- In service: 12 June 2001–present
- Manufacturers: Alstom and Bombardier
- Family name: Z 2N series, X'Trapolis Tagus
- Replaced: Z5300
- Constructed: 2001–2004
- Entered service: 12 June 2001
- Refurbished: 2019–2023
- Number in service: 54 trainsets (216 cars)
- Successor: Z 2N-NG
- Formation: 4 cars per trainset
- Fleet numbers: Z 20901/2 to 21007/8
- Operator: SNCF Transilien
- Depot: Les Ardoines
- Line served: RER RER C Transilien Transilien Line V

Specifications
- Car body construction: Copper steel Stainless steel
- Train length: 103.508 m (339 ft 7.1 in)
- Width: 2.82 m (9 ft 3 in)
- Height: 4.32 m (14 ft 2 in)
- Doors: 2 pairs per side, per car
- Maximum speed: 140 km/h (87 mph)
- Weight: 245,000 kg (540,000 lb)
- Traction system: Alstom OniX IGBT–VVVF
- Traction motors: 8 × 4 FXA 2858 (asynchronous motors)
- Power output: 3,464 kW (4,645 hp)
- Transmission: Gear wheel, hollow shaft and cardan shaft, ratio : 4.18
- Acceleration: 1 m/s^{2} (3.3 ft/s^{2})
- Deceleration: 0.95 m/s^{2} (3.1 ft/s^{2}) (service); 0.95 m/s^{2} (3.1 ft/s^{2}) (emergency)
- Electric systems: Overhead line: 25 kV 50 Hz AC; 1,500 V DC
- Current collection: Pantograph Type AM18
- Bogies: type Y401(motor)/Y30PL(trailer), H shape
- Braking system: Electrodynamic regeneratif
- Safety systems: Crocodile, KVB
- Coupling system: Scharfenberg type
- Multiple working: Other Z 2N series trains (Z 5600, Z 8800, Z 20500, Z 20900)
- Track gauge: 1,435 mm (4 ft 8 1/2 in) standard gauge

The SNCF Class Z 20900 is a double-deck, dual-voltage electric multiple unit (EMU) trainset operated on RER C of the Réseau Express Régional (RER), a hybrid suburban commuter and rapid transit system serving Paris and its Île-de-France suburbs.

Fifty-four four-car trainsets were built by a consortium of Alstom and Bombardier Transportation between 2001 and 2004. The first set entered passenger service in July 2001. They were the final trains produced in the Z 2N series, which had been developed over several generations. Their introduction enabled the withdrawal of older rolling stock from RER C.

== Description ==
SNCF ordered the Class Z 20900 in late 1998 to complete the RER C fleet and replace the last 42 Class Z 5300 units still in service. Based on the earlier Class Z 20500 design, the Z 20900 introduced a number of refinements, including a fixed four-car formation, upgraded seating with armrests, and air-conditioned interiors with tinted windows. The two central cars are connected by gangways to improve passenger flow, and door operations are accompanied by both visual and audible warnings. The trains use the Alstom OniX (French: Onduleur à Intégration eXceptionnelle, lit. 'exceptional integration inverter') traction system with insulated-gate bipolar transistor (IGBT) and variable-frequency drive (VVVF) components, and are equipped with a security feature allowing passenger areas in the power cars to be locked during late-night operations. Each power car (ZB) contains 82 seats, while each trailer car (ZRB) contains 96 seats and is fitted with a toilet.

== History ==
The first Class Z 20900 sets entered service on RER C in July 2001, with deliveries continuing until 2004. Their arrival enabled the withdrawal of the remaining Z 5300 units from the line and, through fleet reassignments, the retirement of the oldest Class Z 6100 units in the northern suburbs. Between 2001 and 2012, twelve sets were allocated to Transilien Line H. The OniX traction system, first tested on unit Z 20887–20888 of the Z 20500 series, is also used in the Class Z 23500 (TER 2N) and CP 3500 series.

== Fleet ==
The Class Z 20900 fleet consists of 54 trainsets, numbered 201 A to 254 A, with the suffix "A" indicating asynchronous motor.

As of 1 January 2022, all 54 trainsets are based at the Les Ardoines SNCF depot and are assigned to the RER C. Each set is formed in a 2M2T configuration, comprising two motored cars and two non-powered trailer cars.

	← Versailles/Pontoise/St Quentin-en-Yvelines Juvisy/Massy-Palaiseau/Saint-Martin-d'Étampes →			
Car No.	1 >	2	3	< 4
Type	Motor	Trailer	Trailer	Motor
Numbering	Z 209xx (odd number)	ZRB 2019xx (odd number)	ZRB 2029xx (odd number)	Z 209xx (even number)

- < or > show a pantograph. Cars 1 and 4 are each equipped with one pantograph.
- Cars 2 and 3 are connected by a gangway.

== Gallery ==
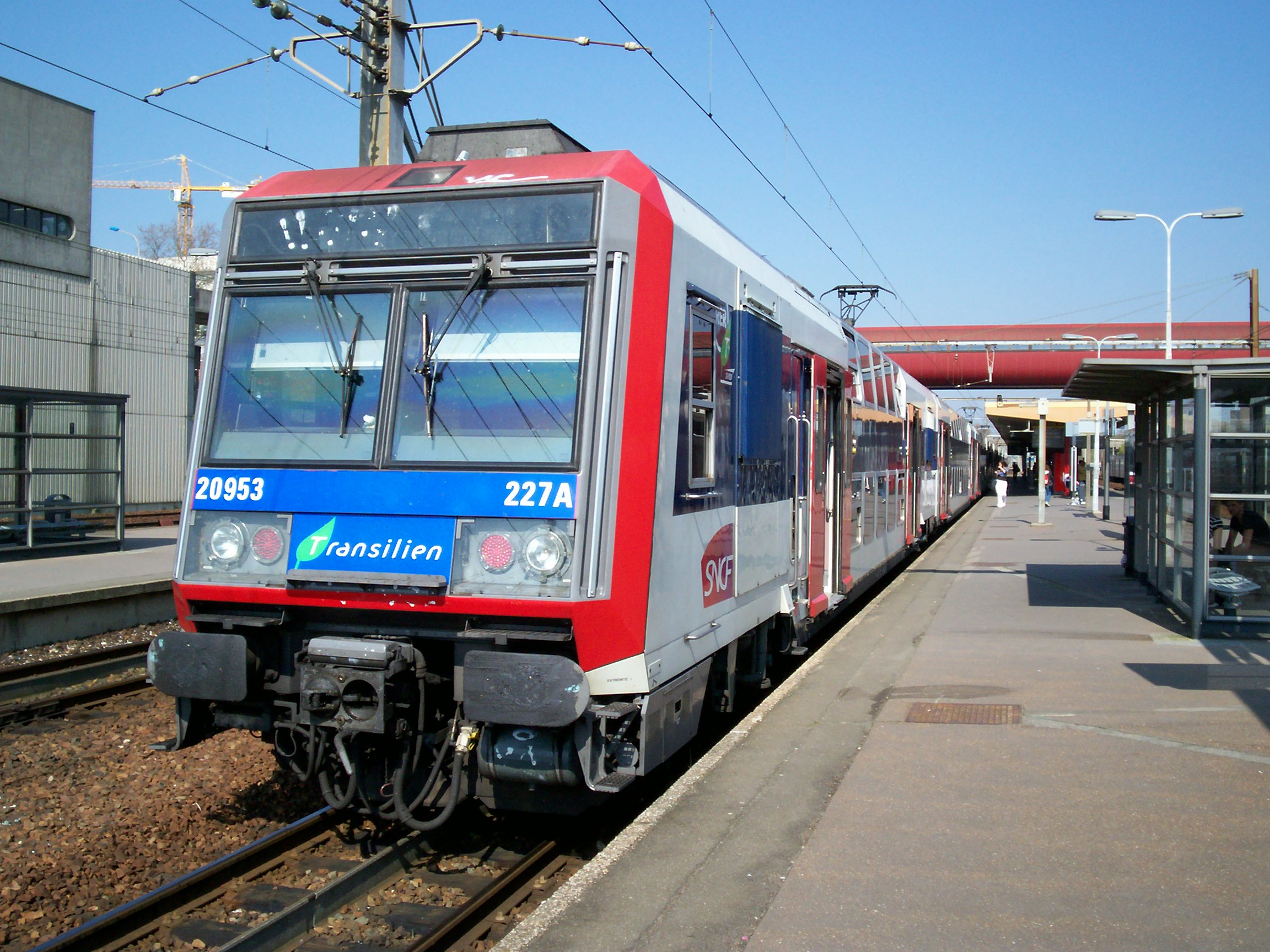
Z 20900 in the SNCF livery

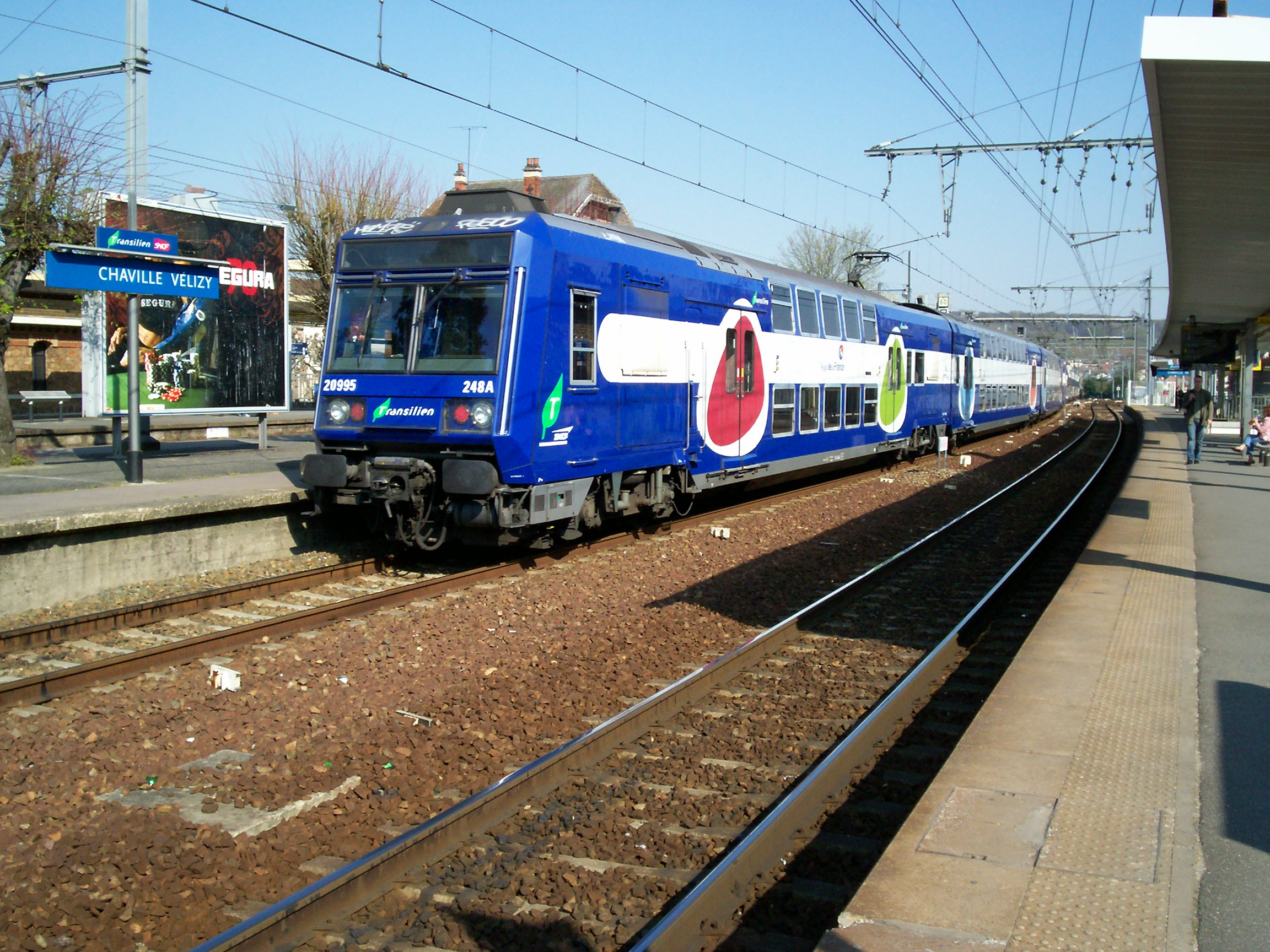
Z 20900 in the navy blue Transilien livery

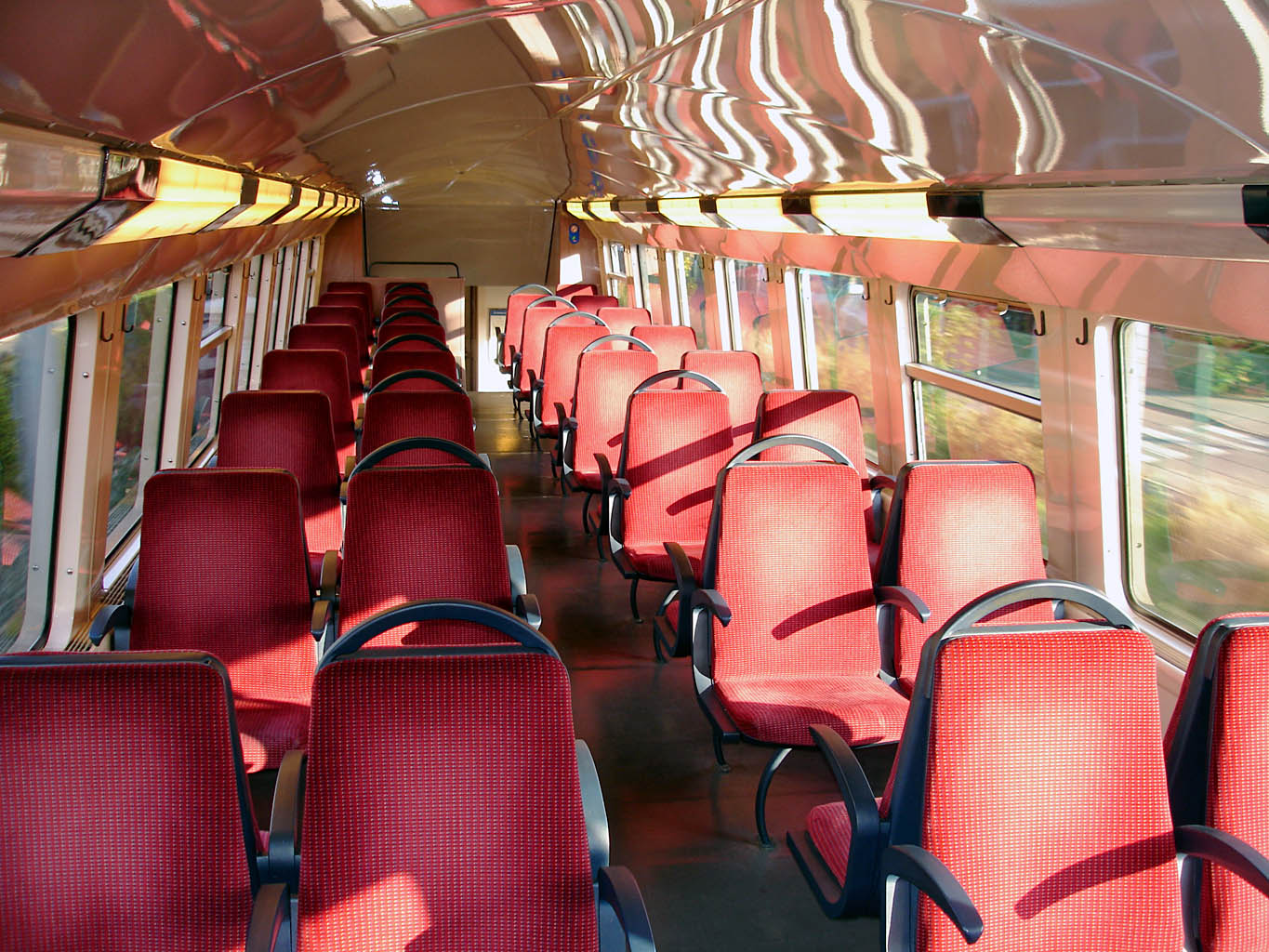
Z 20900 interior, upper deck (original)

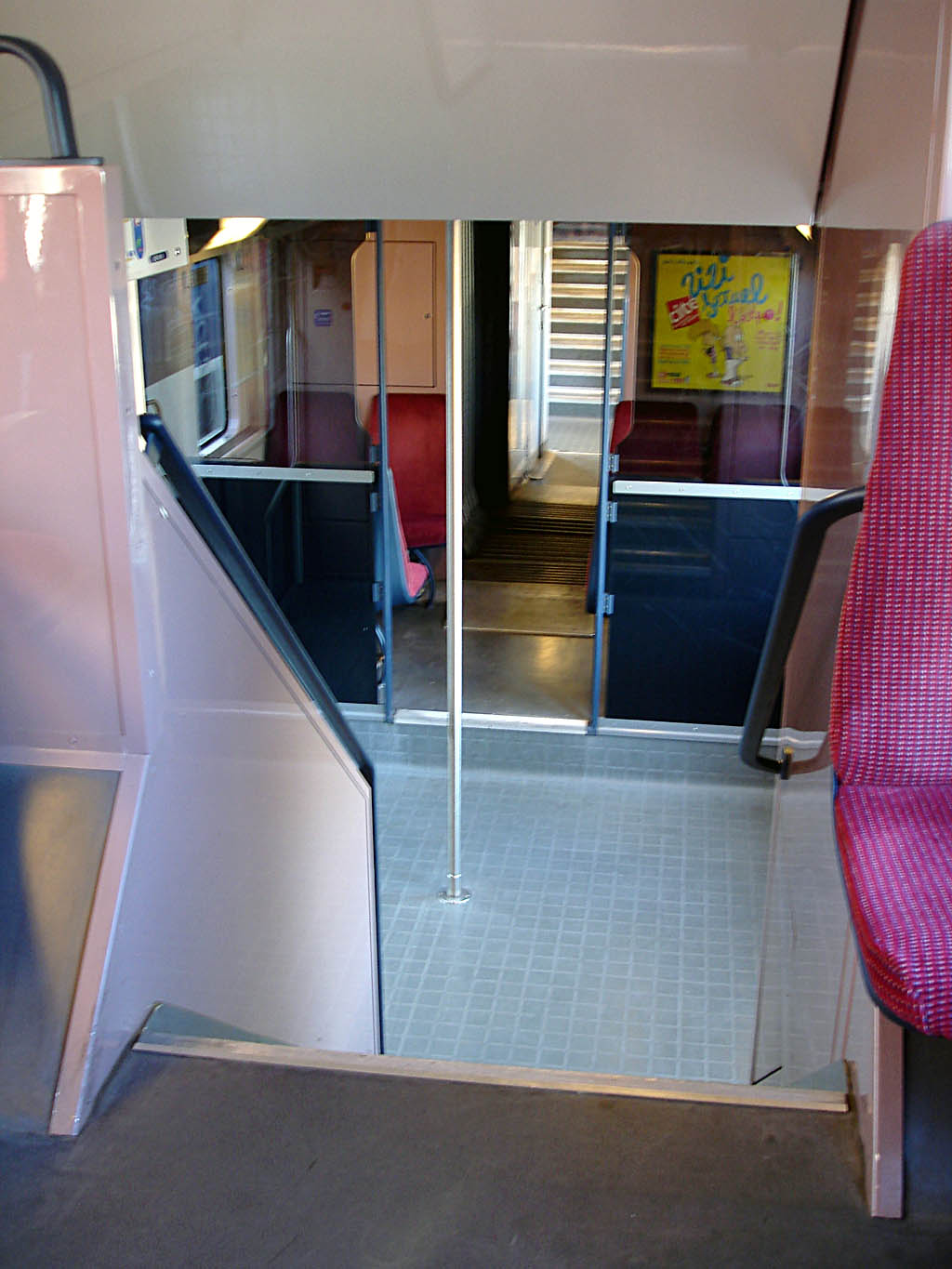
Z 20900 interior, the mid-deck wide entry, and stairs to lower deck, as seen from the upper deck

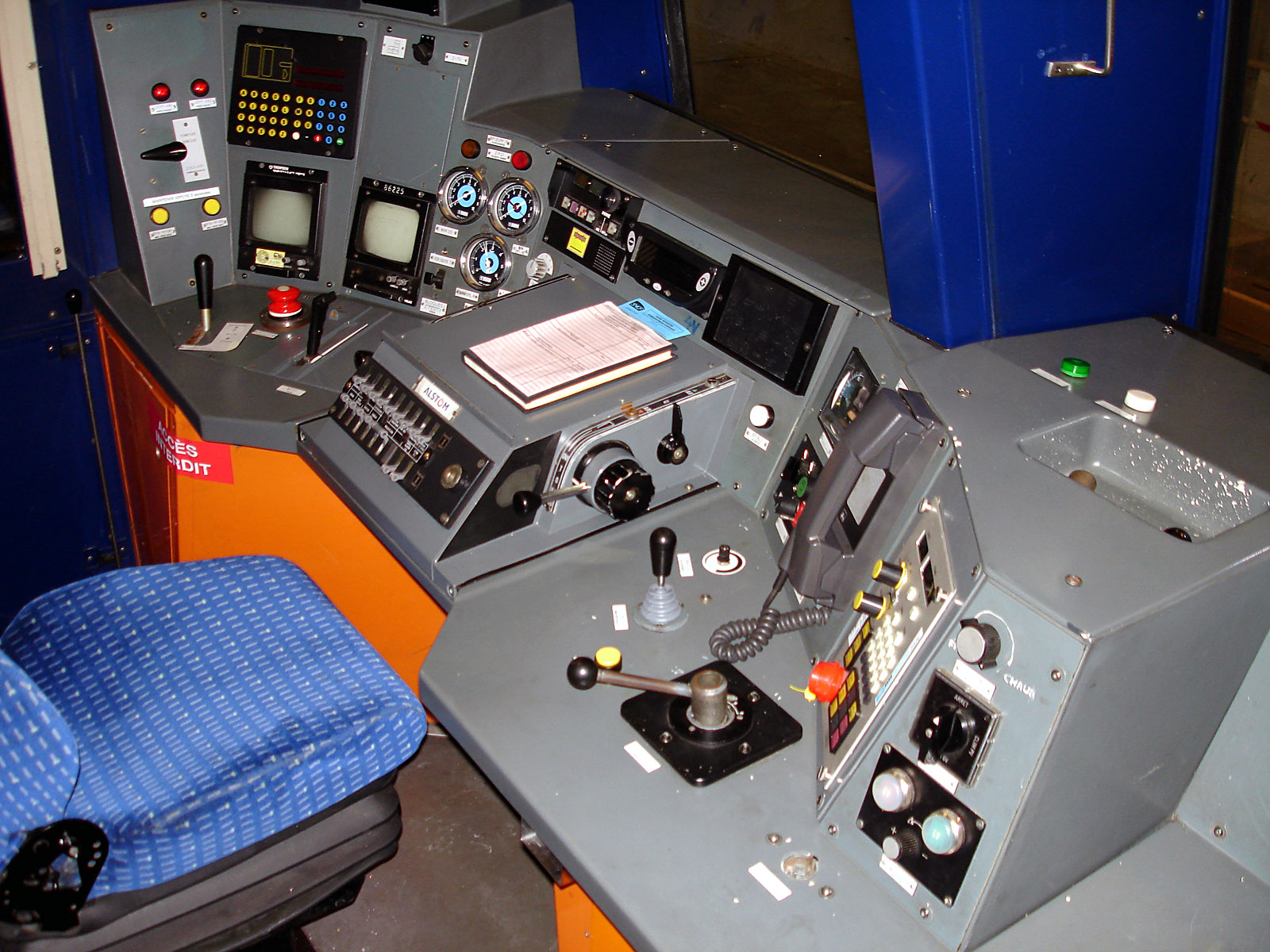
Operators compartment

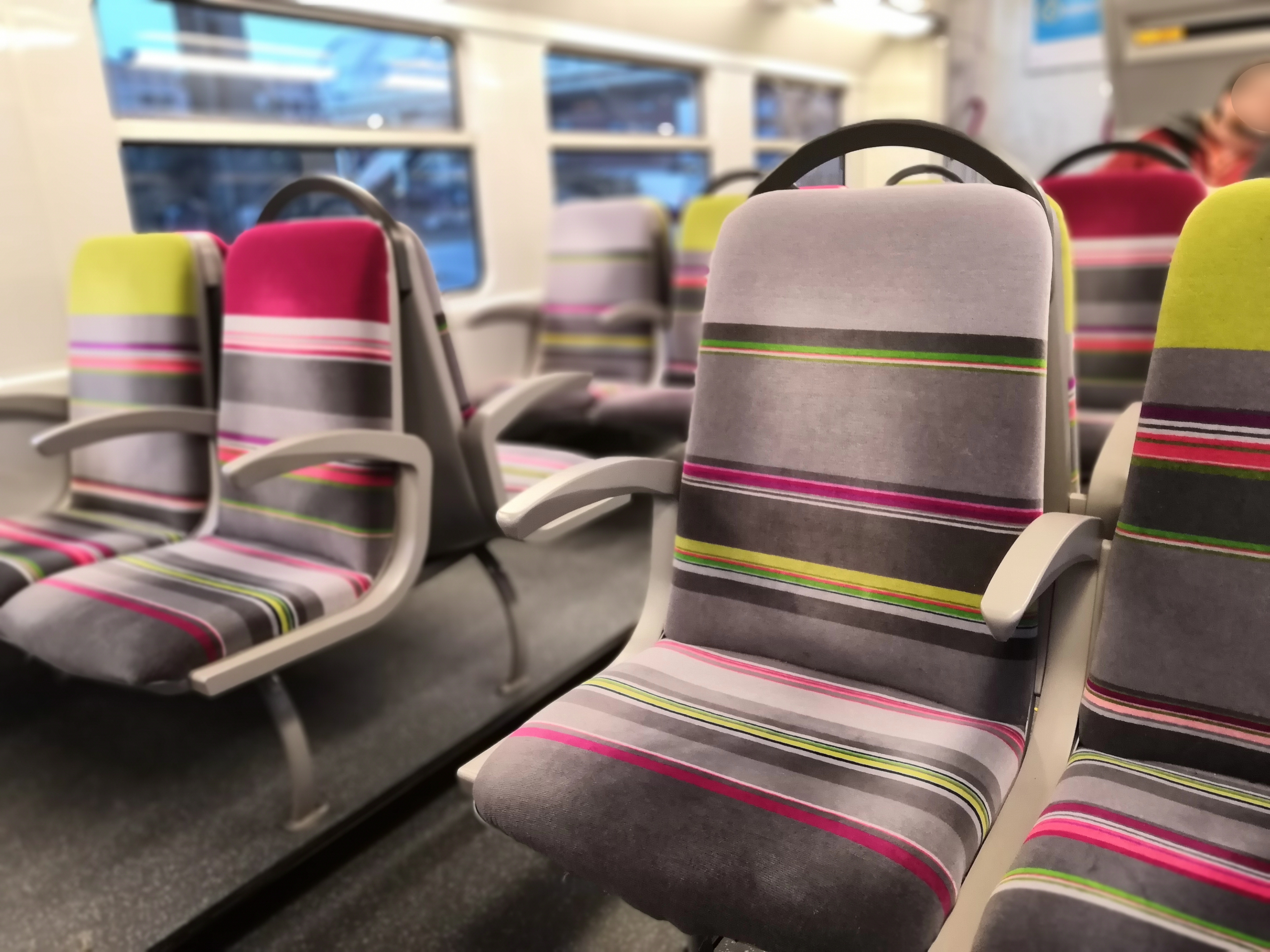
Z 20900 interior (refurbished)

Z 20900, with SIVE and the luminous and audible warning device for the closing of the doors in operation
