= SNCF Class Z 5600 =

French double-decker electric multiple unit trainsets

Z 5600
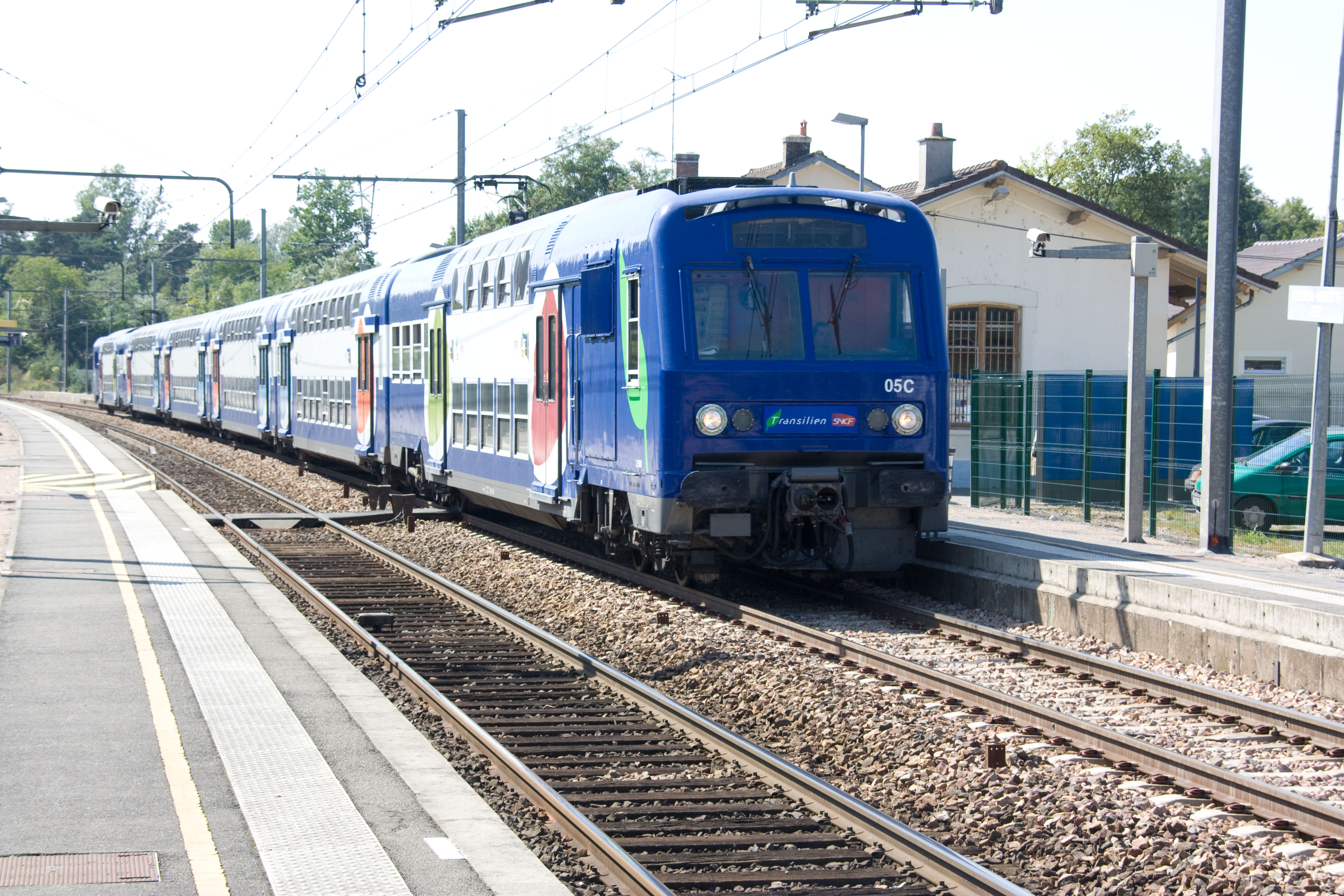
- A Z 5600 trainset operating on Transilien Line R at Bourron-Marlotte – Grez station
- In service: 1982–present
- Manufacturers: CIMT, TCF, and TCO
- Family name: Z 2N series, X'Trapolis Tagus
- Constructed: 1982–1985
- Entered service: 1982
- Refurbished: 2009–2016
- Number built: 52 trainsets (208 cars)
- Number in service: 45 trainsets
- Number scrapped: 7
- Successor: Z57000, Z 2N-NG
- Formation: 4 or 6 cars per trainset
- Fleet numbers: Z 5601/2 to 5703/4
- Capacity: 957 maximum, 528 seated (4 cars); 1,536 maximum, 856 seated (6 cars)
- Operator: SNCF Transilien
- Depots: Les Ardoines; Villeneuve-Saint-Georges
- Line served: Bourgogne-Franche-Comté

Specifications
- Train length: 98.76 m (324 ft 3/16 in) (4 cars); 147.32 m (483 ft 4 in) (6 cars)
- Width: 2.846 m (9 ft 4 1/16 in)
- Height: 4.32 m (14 ft 2 3/32 in)
- Doors: 2 pairs per side, per car
- Maximum speed: 140 km/h (87 mph)
- Weight: 294,500 kg (649,300 lb) (power car); 212,500 kg (468,500 lb) (trailer car)
- Traction system: Chopper and thyristors
- Traction motors: 4 * FHO 3262 TCO (750 V DC)
- Power output: 2,800 kW (3,800 hp)
- Electric systems: Overhead line, 1,500 V DC
- Current collection: Pantograph
- Coupling system: Scharfenberg type
- Multiple working: Other Z 2N series trains (Z 5600, Z 8800, Z 20500, Z 20900)
- Track gauge: 1,435 mm (4 ft 8 1/2 in) standard gauge

The SNCF Class Z 5600 is a double-deck electric multiple unit trainset that is operated by SNCF on line C of the Réseau Express Régional (RER), a hybrid suburban commuter and rapid transit system serving Paris and its Île-de-France suburbs and the TER Bourgogne-Franche-Comté regional rail system.

The 52 trainsets were built by a consortium of CIMT, TCF, and TCO between 1982 and 1985.

The Z 5600 trainsets proved successful and became the basis for the Z 2N series of trainsets, which were continuously improved over several generations. The Z 2N series was also the basis of the later MI 2N family of double-deck, dual power trainsets.

== History ==
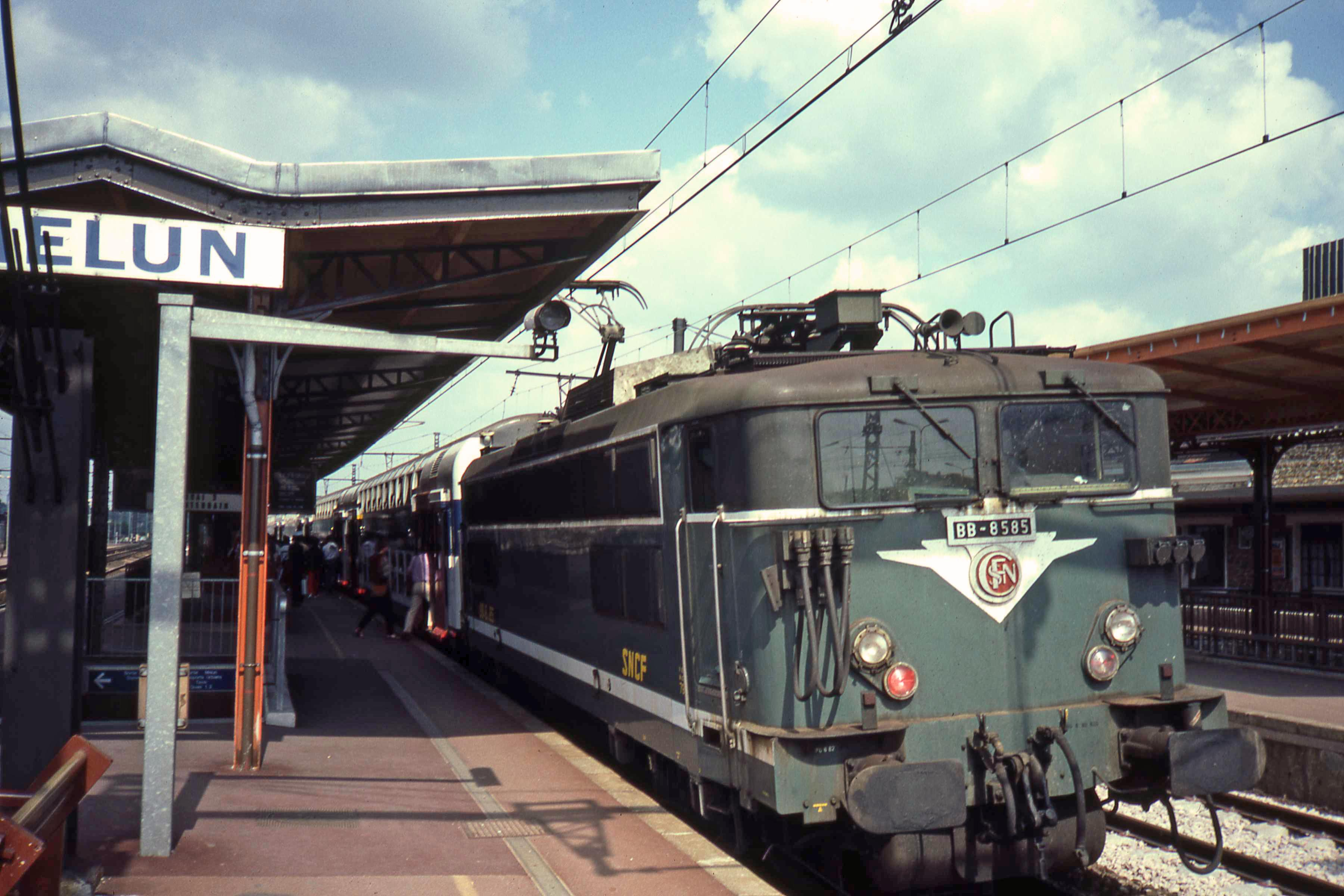
BB 8500 coupled to a train of Z 5600 trailers cars at Melun station

After the SNCF's successful introduction of the VB2N double-deck locomotive-hauled trainsets, the railway wanted to extend the concept of two-level to self-propelled equipment, also known as a multiple unit trainsets. Electric multiple unit trainsets offers a major advantage: the motors can be distributed across the entire train, instead of being concentrated in a locomotive. This improves traction and therefore accelerations which is useful on suburban commuter rail systems with frequent stops, like the RER.

The Z 5600 was SNCF's first venture into creating a double-deck electric multiple unit trainset. The equipment would be based on the VB2N and SNCF placed an order for trainsets to be built by a consortium of CIMT, TCF, and TCO between 1982 and 1985.

The ZR trailer cars, which had no motors or electrical equipment, were built and delivered faster than the more complex power cars. In order to take advantage of the equipment as quickly as possible, SNCF operated the trailer cars between a pair of Class BB 8500 electric locomotives. These unique trainsets were used from 1982 until 1984 in the south-eastern suburbs, the lines that would make up the future RER D line and Transilien Line R.

As the power cars began to arrive in 1984, 36 Z 5600 four-car trainsets went into service on the RER C line, relieving the single-level Class Z 5300 trainsets, especially at peak times. Additionally, 16 five-car trainsets were assigned to continue to work in the south-eastern suburbs.

The Z 5600 trainsets proved successful and became the basis for the Z 2N family of trainsets, which were continuously improved over several generations. The Z 2N family was also the basis of the later MI 2N family of double-deck, dual power trainsets.

In the early 1990s, some of the Z 5600 trainsets were expanded from four cars (two power cars and two trailers) to six cars with the addition of two extra trailer cars that were purchased in the order of the Class Z 20500 trainsets. These extra cars allowed these trainsets to carry additional passengers but did create some operating issues: the extra weight caused some reliability problems with the power cars and slowed rate of acceleration. In 2001, the sets were changed up again, with the Z 20500 trailer cars removed (and placed back into other Z 20500 trainsets), and VB2N trailers inserted into the Z 5600s, creating a total of 20 six-car trainsets.

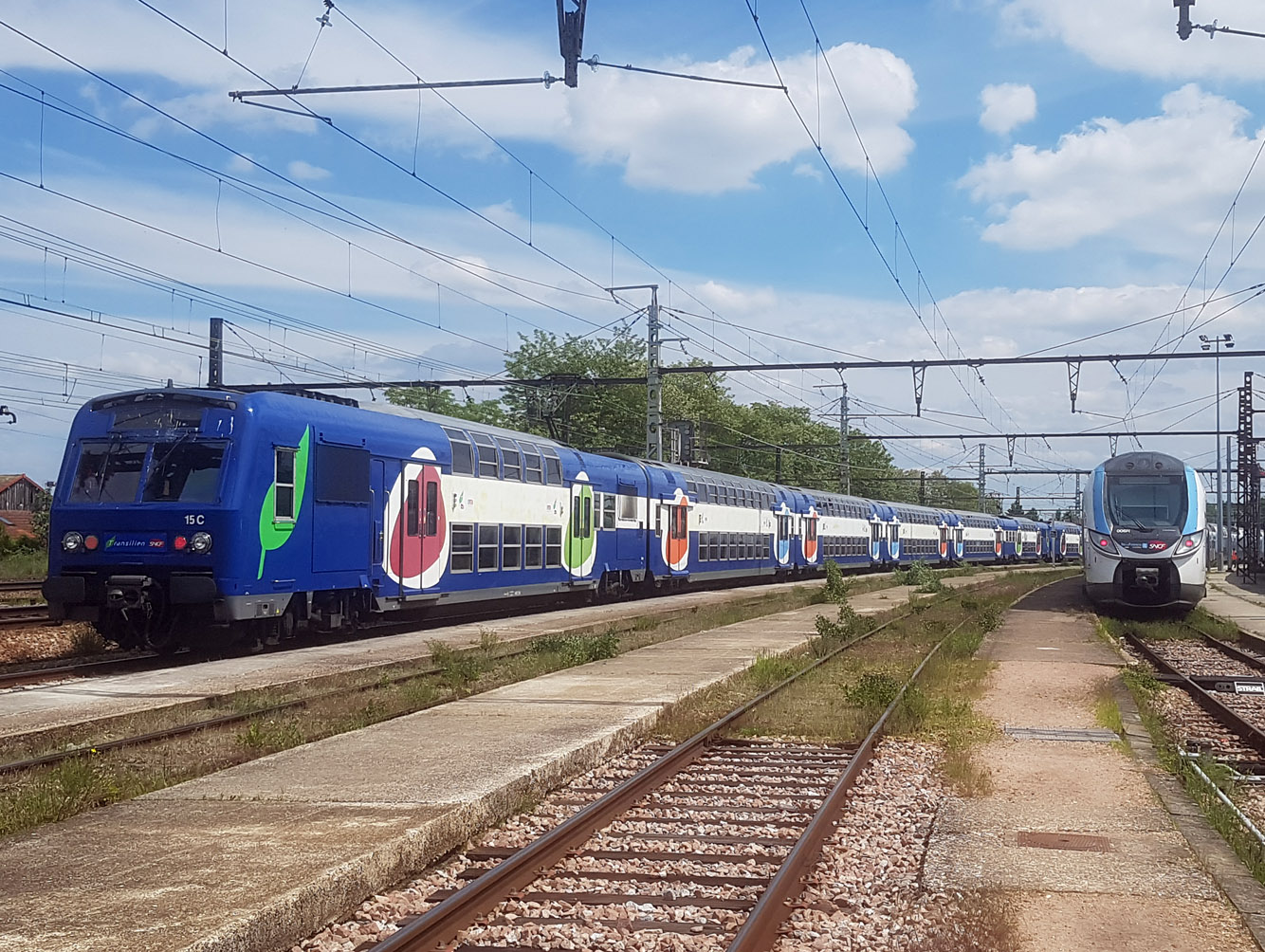
Refurbished six-car Z 5600 trainset near Montereau station on Transilien Line R

The Z 5600 trainsets received a renovation between 2009 and 2016. During the renovation process, folding seats and interior partitions were removed, seats were replaced, the former first-class areas were reconfigured to use 3 + 2 seating, and onboard passenger information and video surveillance systems were installed. But the Z 5600 did not receive air conditioning during the renovations, provoking the anger of user associations.

With the deliveries of the Regio 2N trainsets, the Z 5600 trainsets were removed from the RER D in September 2020. Some Z 5600 trainsets are still assigned to operate out of the Villeneuve-Saint-Georges depot on the TER Bourgogne-Franche-Comté and the Transilien Line R, but they are seldom used. Only two TER round-trips per day are scheduled to use the Z 5600 trainsets and they are only used as backup equipment on the R line.

The last Z 5600 trains on lines C and R are to be replaced by cascaded Z 20500 trains from RER D as this line receives the RER NG trains.

== Formations ==
As of 1 January 2022, 57 Z8800 trainsets are based at the Les Ardoines (RER C) and Villeneuve (Transilien R) SNCF depots.

There are 22 four-car trainsets (17C–31C, 36C–38C, 40C, 42C–43C, 49C) on the RER C. As shown below, they are formed with two motored cars and two non-powered (trailer) cars (2M2T).

	← Versailles/St Quentin-en-Yvelines Juvisy/Versailles/Saint-Martin-d'Étampes/Dourdan-la-Forêt →			
Car No.	1 >	2	3	< 4
Type	Motor	Trailer	Trailer	Motor
Numbering	Z 56xx (odd number)	ZRB 256xx (odd number)	ZRAB 356xx (odd number)	Z 56xx (even number)

- < or > show a pantograph. Cars 1 and 4 are each equipped with one pantograph.
- Car 2 was formerly a mixed 1st class and 2nd class car.

There are 30 six-car trainsets (1C–15C, 32C–35C, 39C, 41C, 44C–52C) on the RER C and Transilien R. As shown below, they are formed with two motored cars and four non-powered (trailer) cars (2M4T).

RER C	← Versailles/St Quentin-en-Yvelines Juvisy/Versailles/Saint-Martin-d'Étampes/Dourdan-la-Forêt →					
Transilien R	← Gare de Lyon (Paris) Montargis/Montereau →					
Car No.	1 >	2	3	4	5	< 6
Type	Motor	Trailer	Trailer	Trailer	Trailer	Motor
Numbering	Z 56xx (odd number)	ZRB 256xx (odd number)	ZRAB 356xx (odd number)	ZRB 256xx (odd number)	ZRB 256xx (odd number)	Z 56xx (even number)

- < or > show a pantograph. Cars 1 and 6 are each equipped with one pantograph.
- Car 2 was formerly a mixed 1st class and 2nd class car.

== Fleet ==
The number of Z5600 trainsets is 45 : 36 for C Line,9 for R Line

- Listing Fleet Z5600 (in French)

== Photo gallery ==
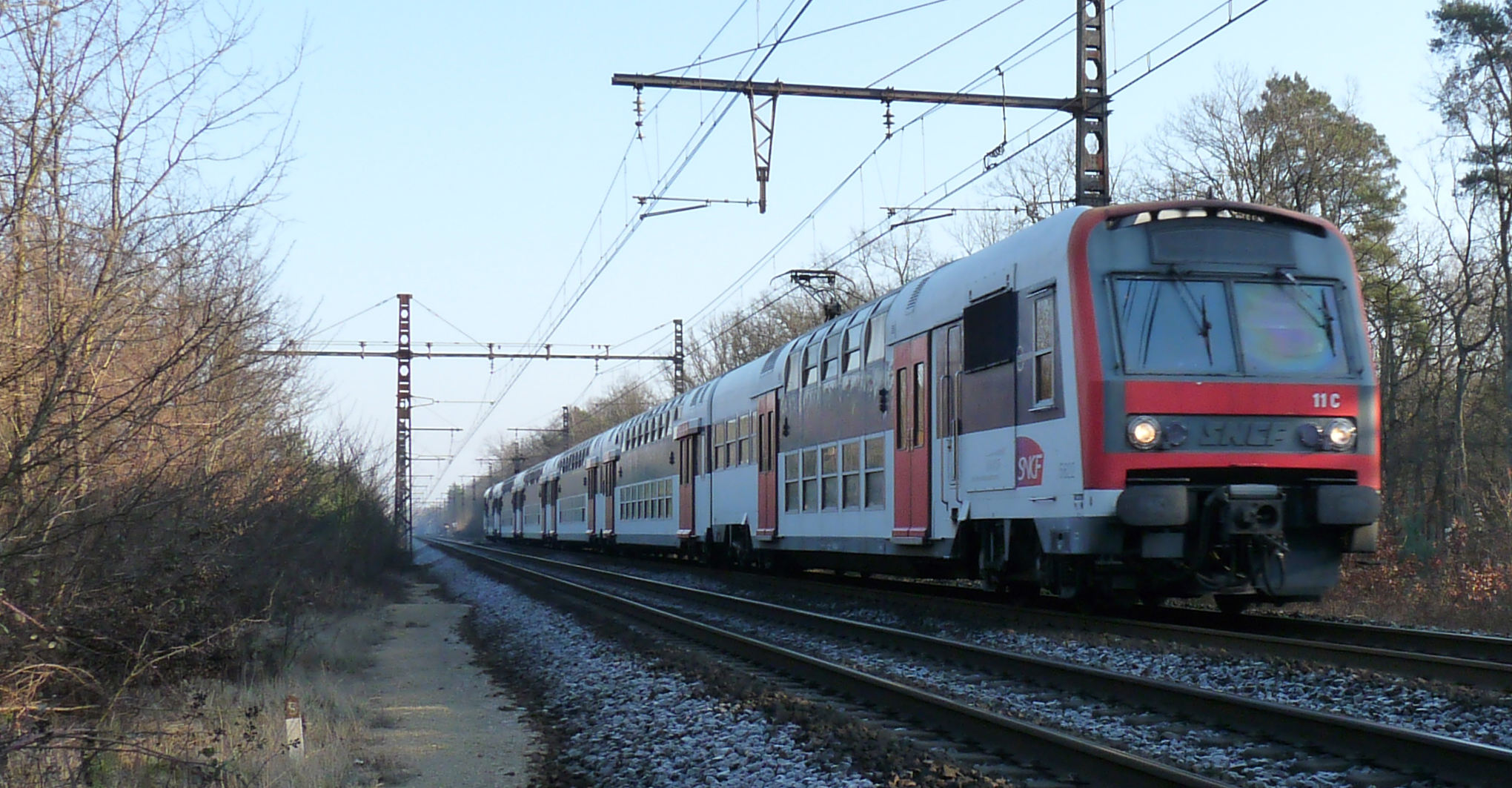
Z 5600 in original "Ile de France" livery near Thomery station

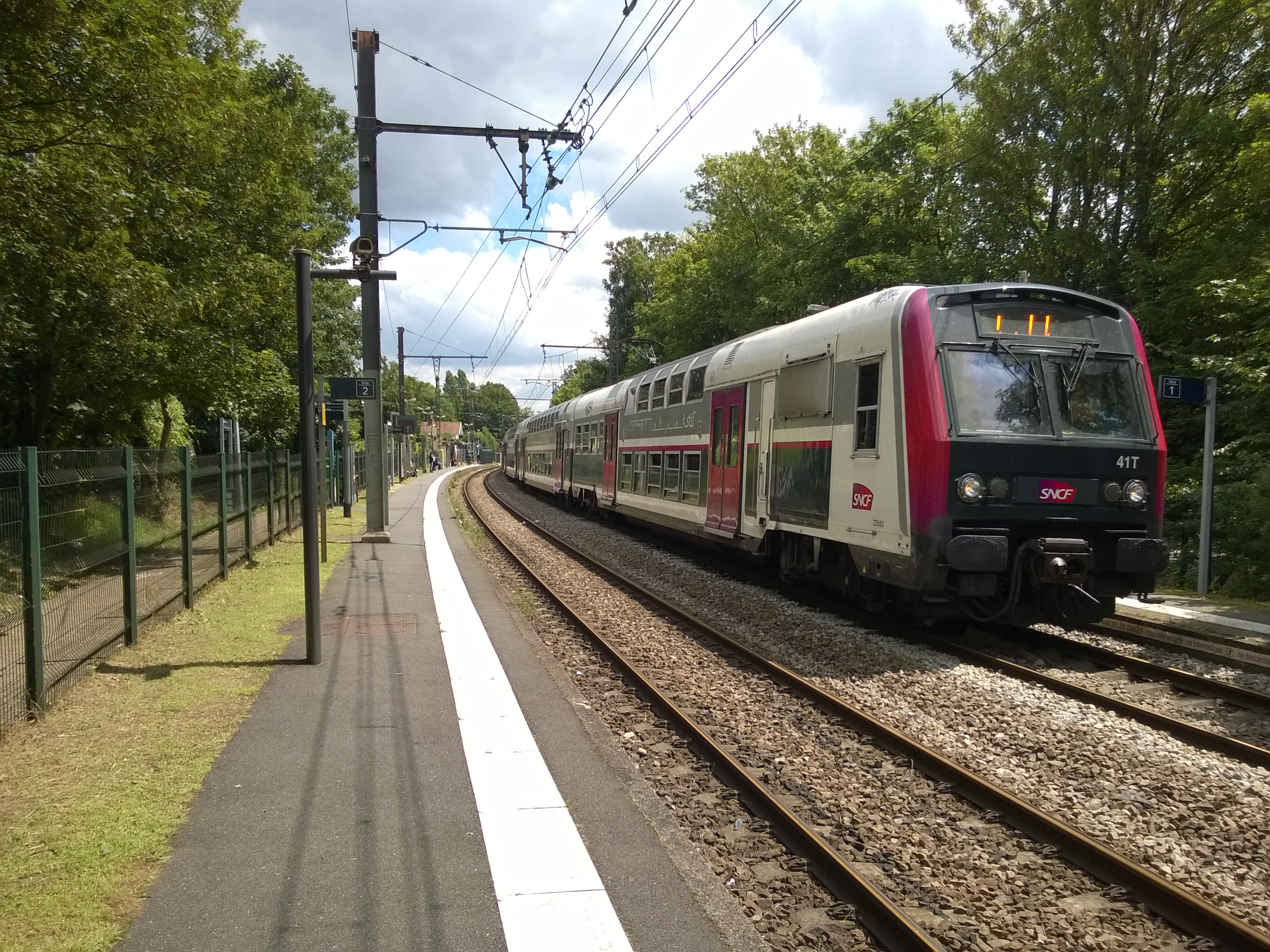
Z 5600 in "Carmillon" livery at Chilly-Mazarin station.

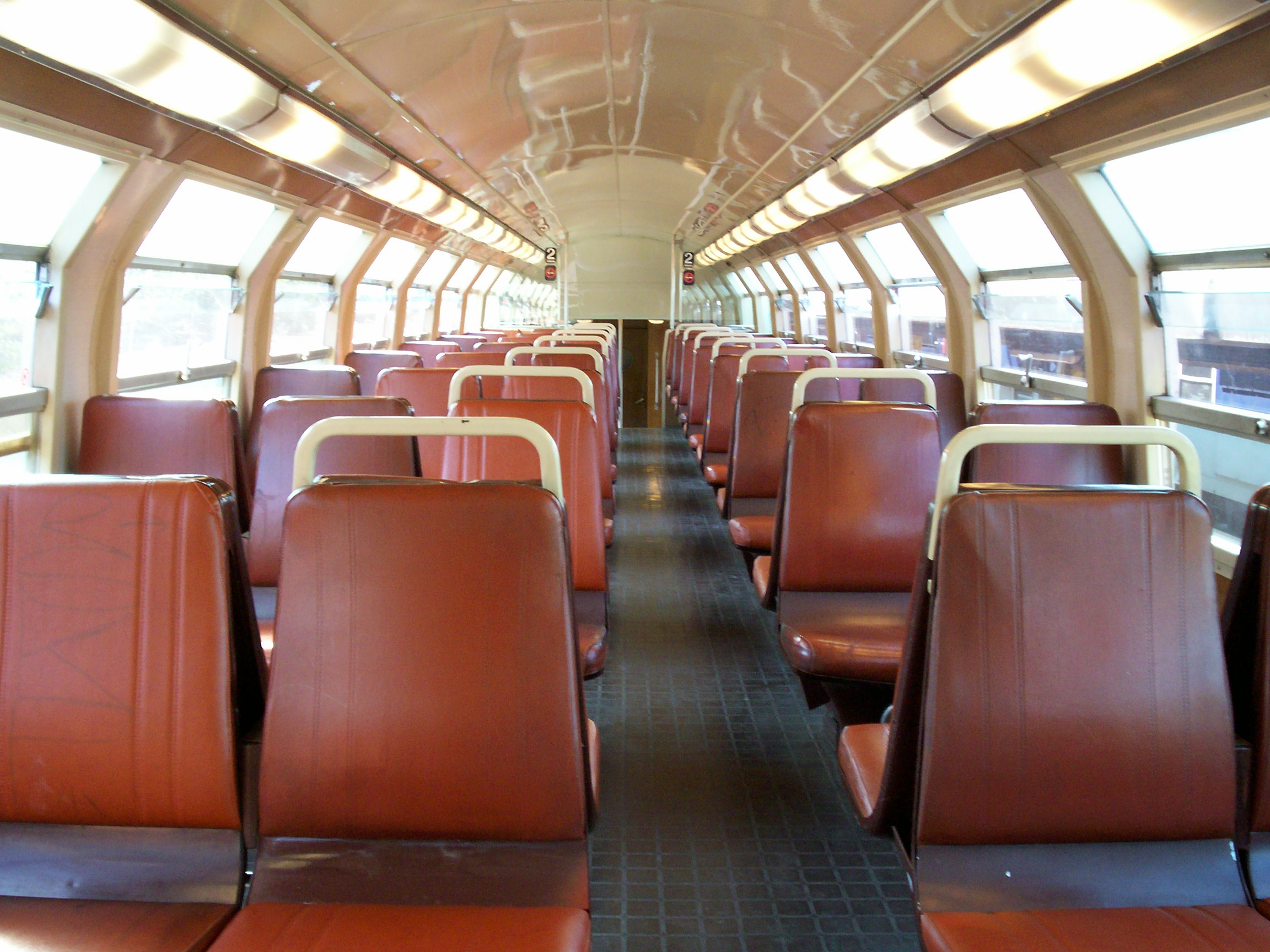
Z 5600 interior, upper deck

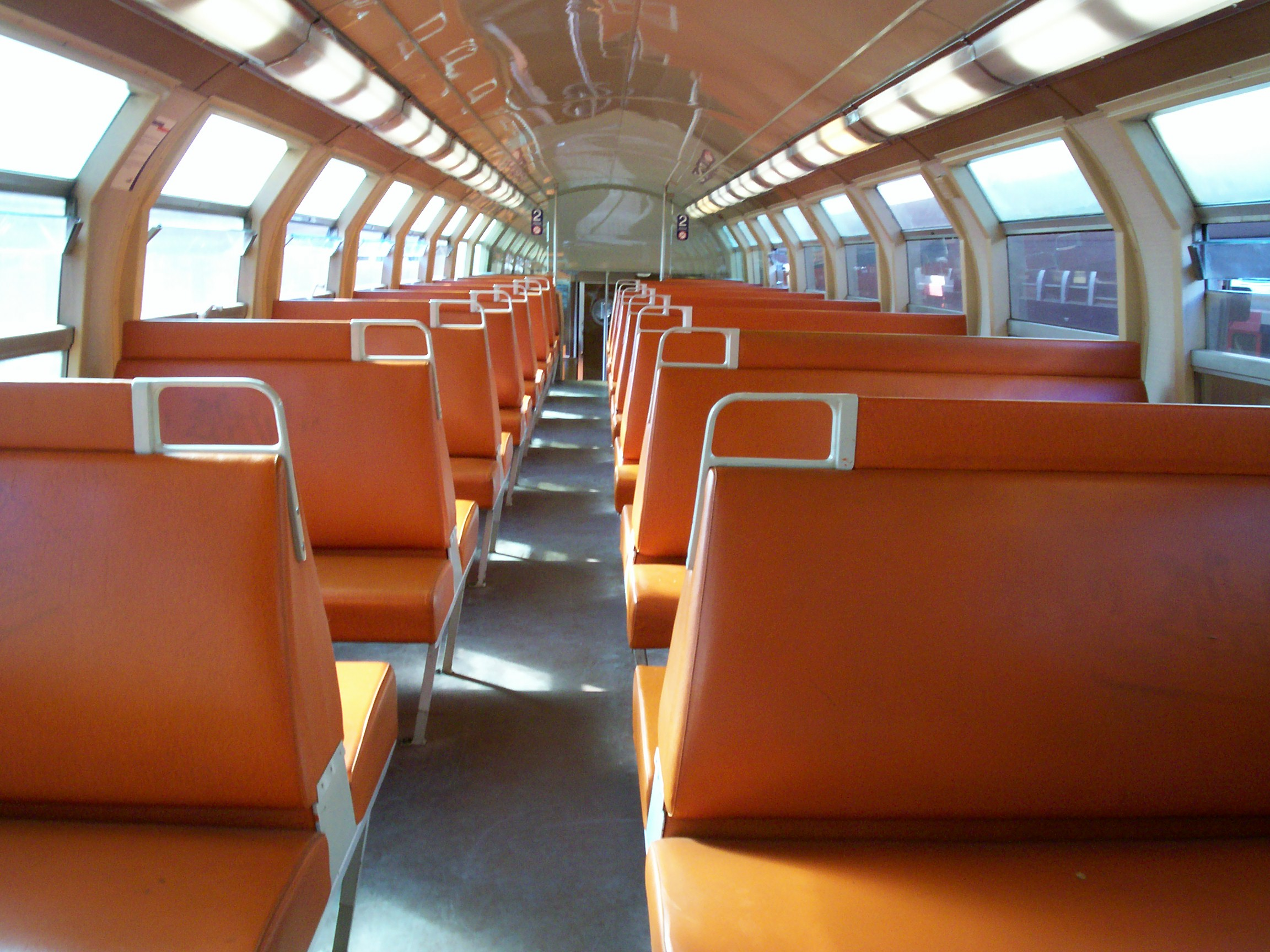
Interior, upper deck of an ex-VB2N trailer
