= Z 2N series =

Family of double-deck trainsets

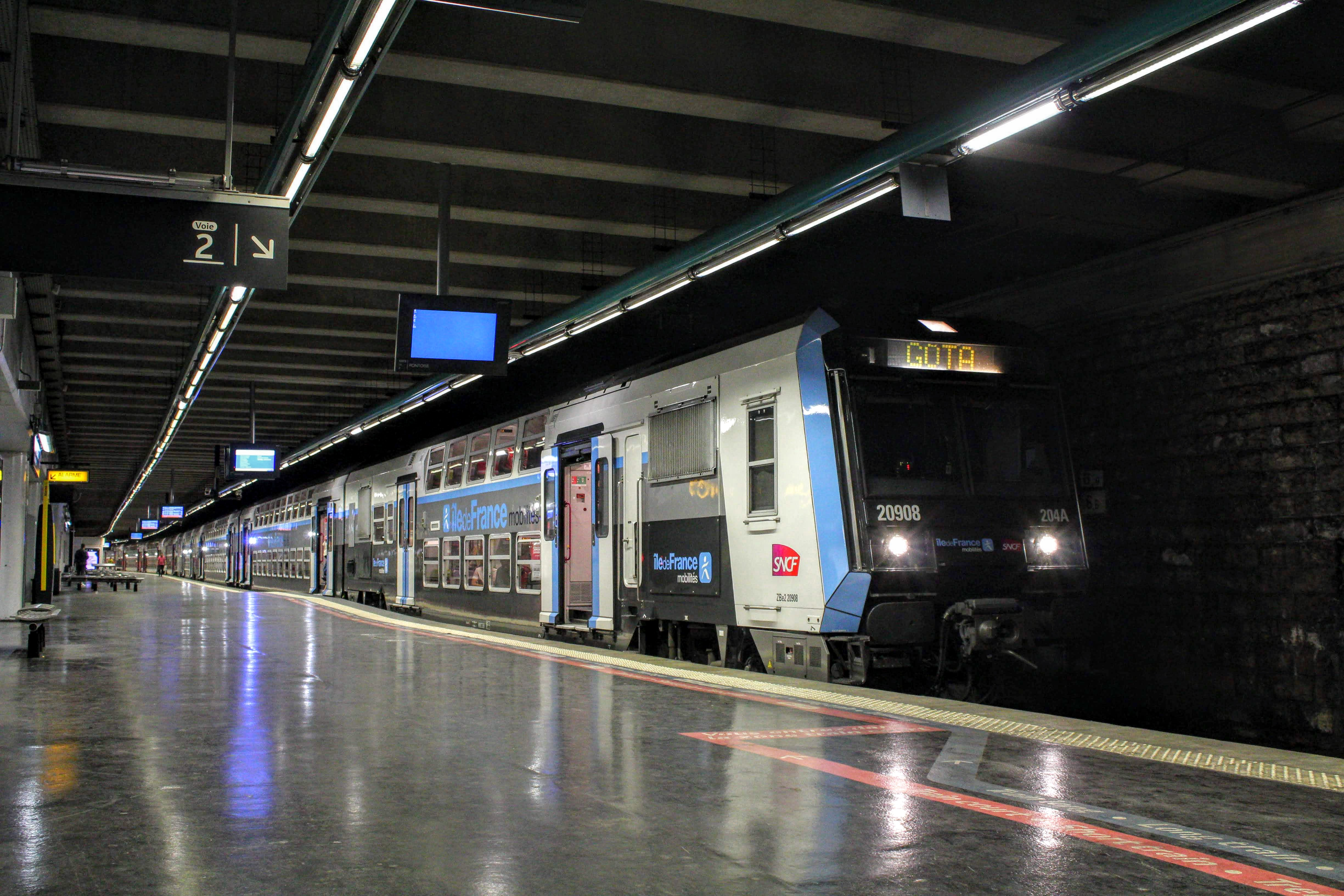
- Refurbished Z 20900
- In service: 1982–present
- Constructed: 1982–2004

Specifications
- Doors: 2 pairs per side, per car
- Maximum speed: 140 km/h (87 mph)
- Current collection: Pantograph
- Multiple working: All Z 2N series trains can operate together
- Track gauge: 1,435 mm (4 ft 8 1/2 in) standard gauge

The Z 2N (French: Automotrice Z à 2 niveaux, English: two-level Z series) is a family of double-deck electric multiple unit trainsets that are operated on the Réseau Express Régional (RER), a hybrid suburban commuter and rapid transit system and the Transilien, a suburban commuter rail system, both serving Paris and its Île-de-France suburbs.

== Variants ==
There are five variants of the Z 2N that have been produced:

- The Z 5600 is the original version of the Z 2N, it is a single-voltage trainset (1.5 kV DC). 52 trains were built between 1982 and 1985 by CIMT, TCF and TCO. Currently the type is primarily assigned to the RER C line, and the TER Bourgogne-Franche-Comté line.
- The Z 8800 added dual-voltage capabilities (1.5 kV DC and 25 kV AC). 58 trains were built between 1985 and 1988 by ANF, CIMT, and TCO. Currently the type is assigned to the RER C line, and the Transilien N and U lines.
- The Z 20500 is dual-voltage capable and is an improved version of the Z 8800. 194 trains were built between 1988 and 1998 by Alstom, ANF, and CIMT. Currently the type is assigned to the RER C and D lines, and the Transilien P and R lines.
  - The Z 92050 is mechanically identical to the Z 20500, but with a different class number because they were purchased by the Nord-Pas-de-Calais region for TER services. The trains were purchased by the Île-de-France region in December 2012 and refurbished to more closely resemble the rest of the Z 20500 class. Six trains were built in 1996 by GEC-Alsthom, ANF, and CIMT. Currently the type is assigned to Transilien Line P.
- The Z 20900 is dual-voltage capable and is an improved version of the Z 20500. 54 trains were built between 2001 and 2004 by Alstom and Bombardier. Currently the type is assigned to the RER C.

The Renfe Class 450 (built 1988) and CP Class 3500 (built 1999) are also based on the Z 2N family of trains.

== Gallery ==
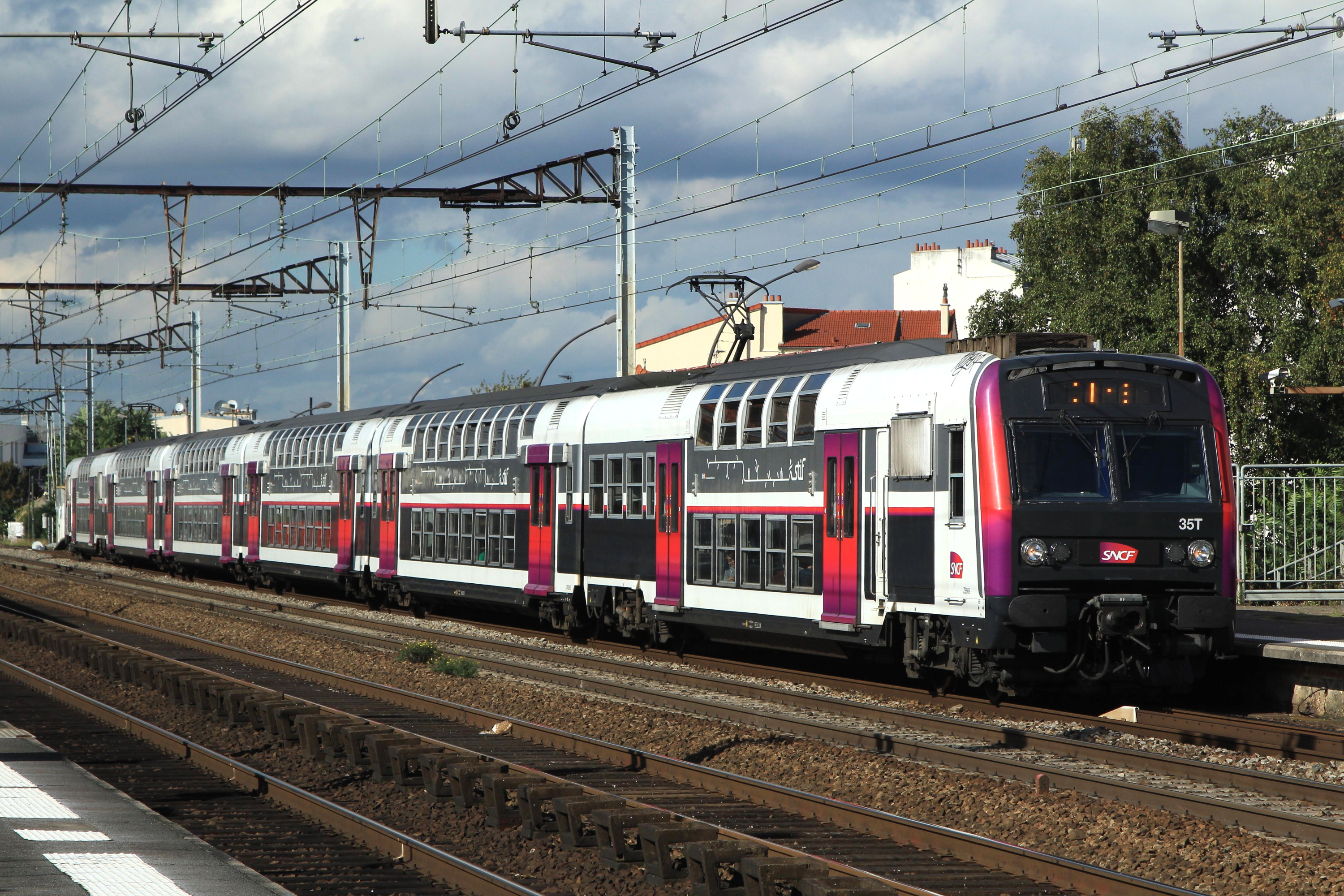
SNCF Z 5600

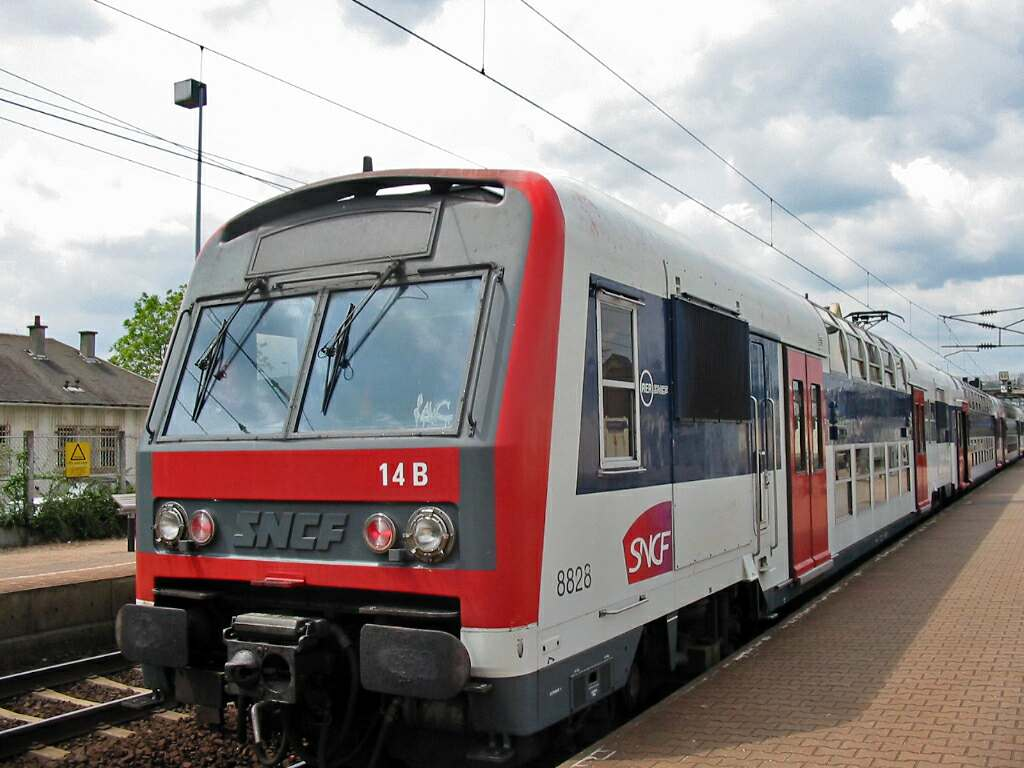
SNCF Z 8800

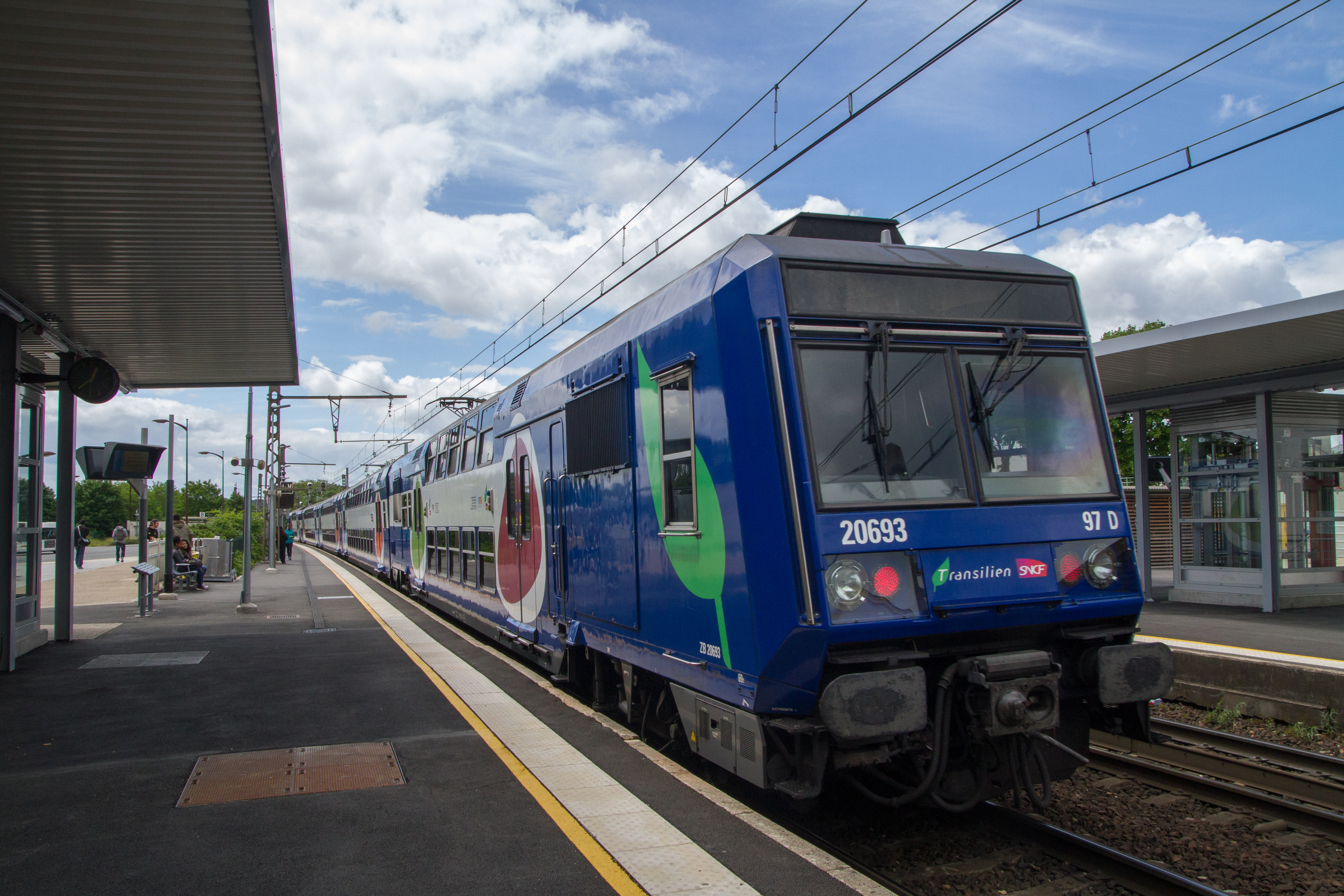
SNCF Z 20500

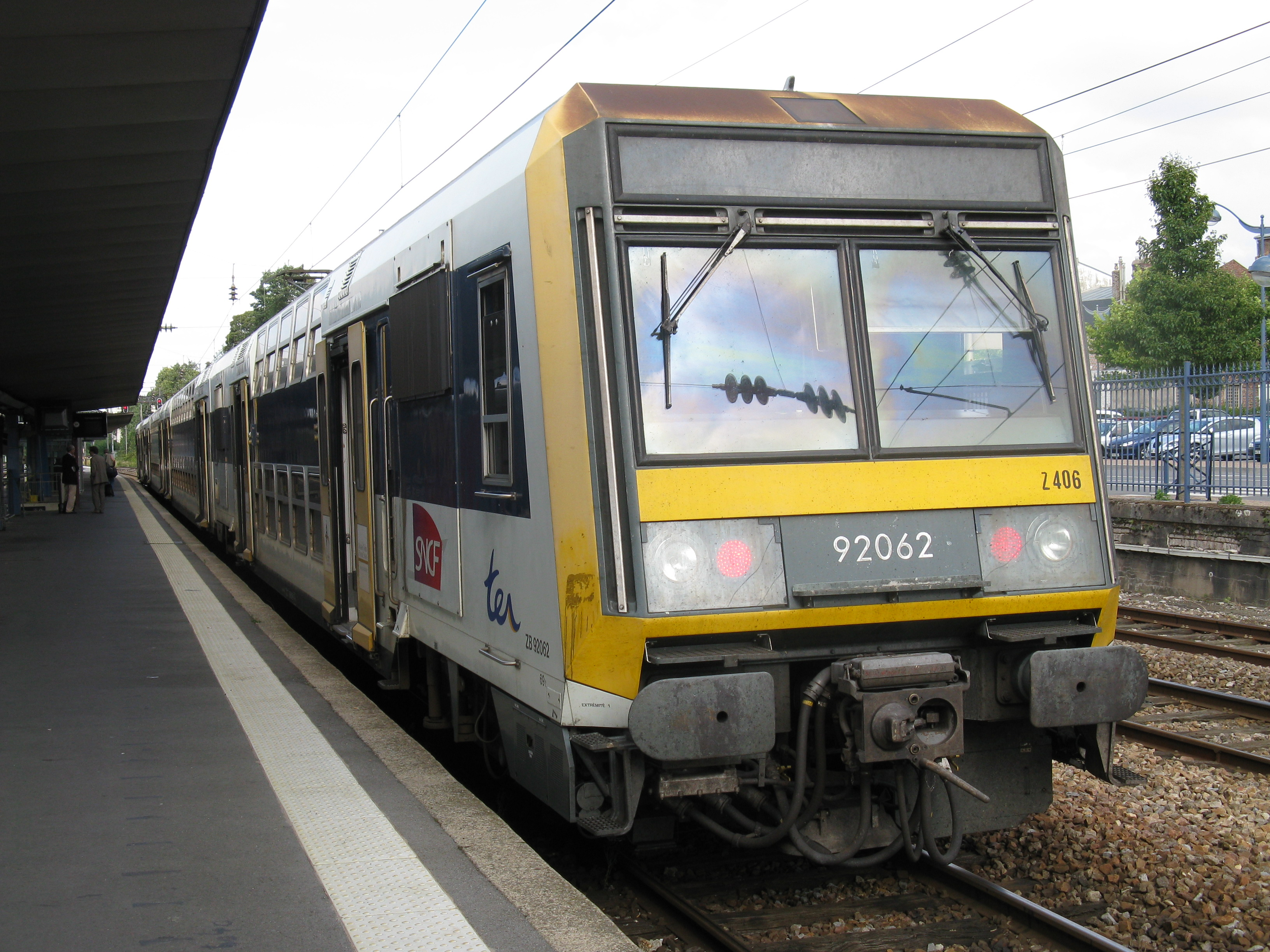
SNCF Z 92050

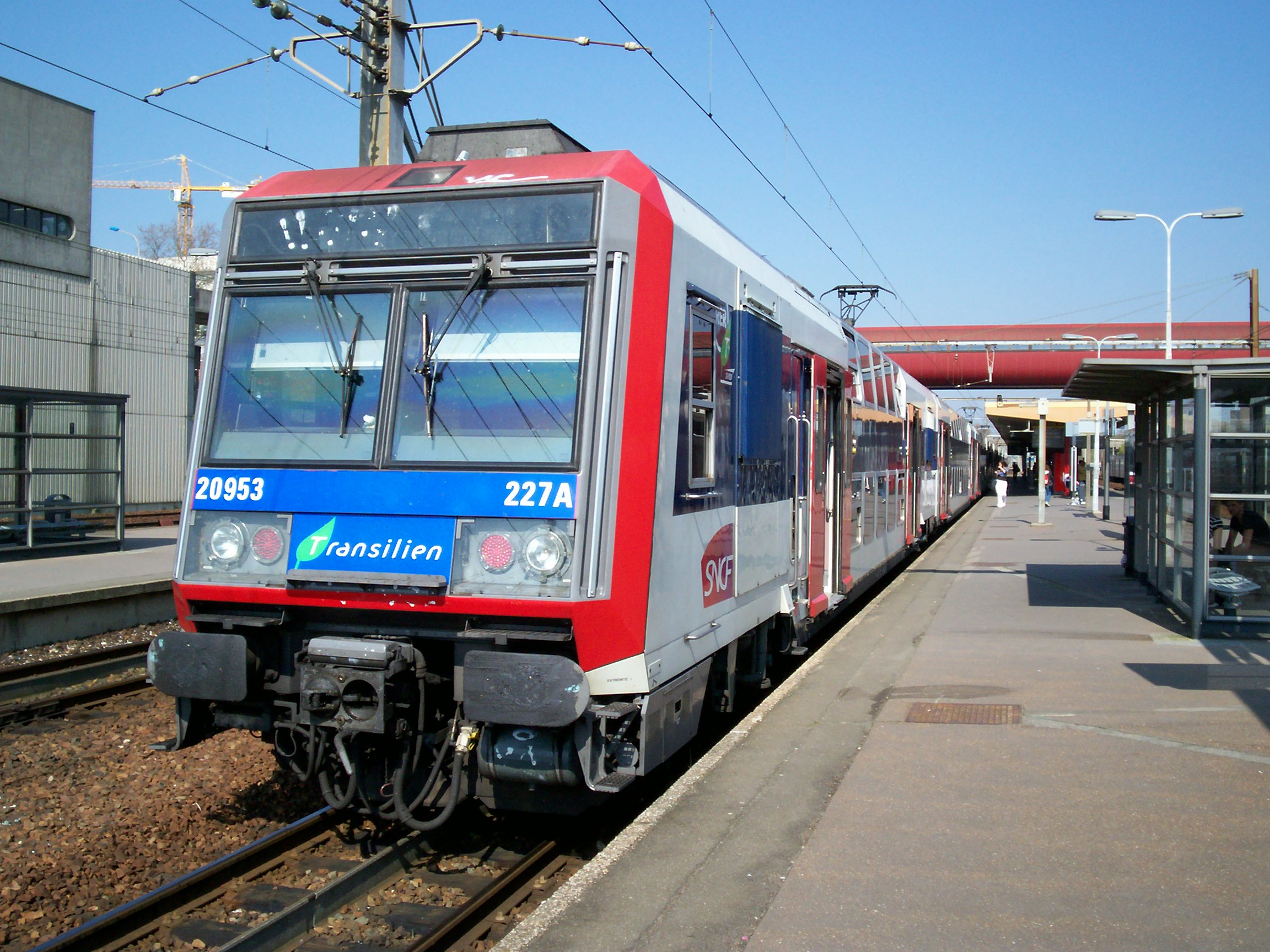
SNCF Z 20900

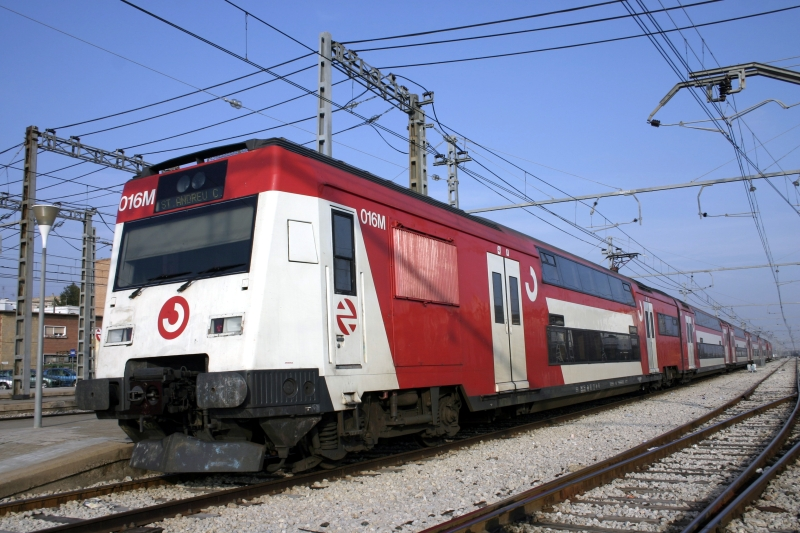
Renfe Class 450

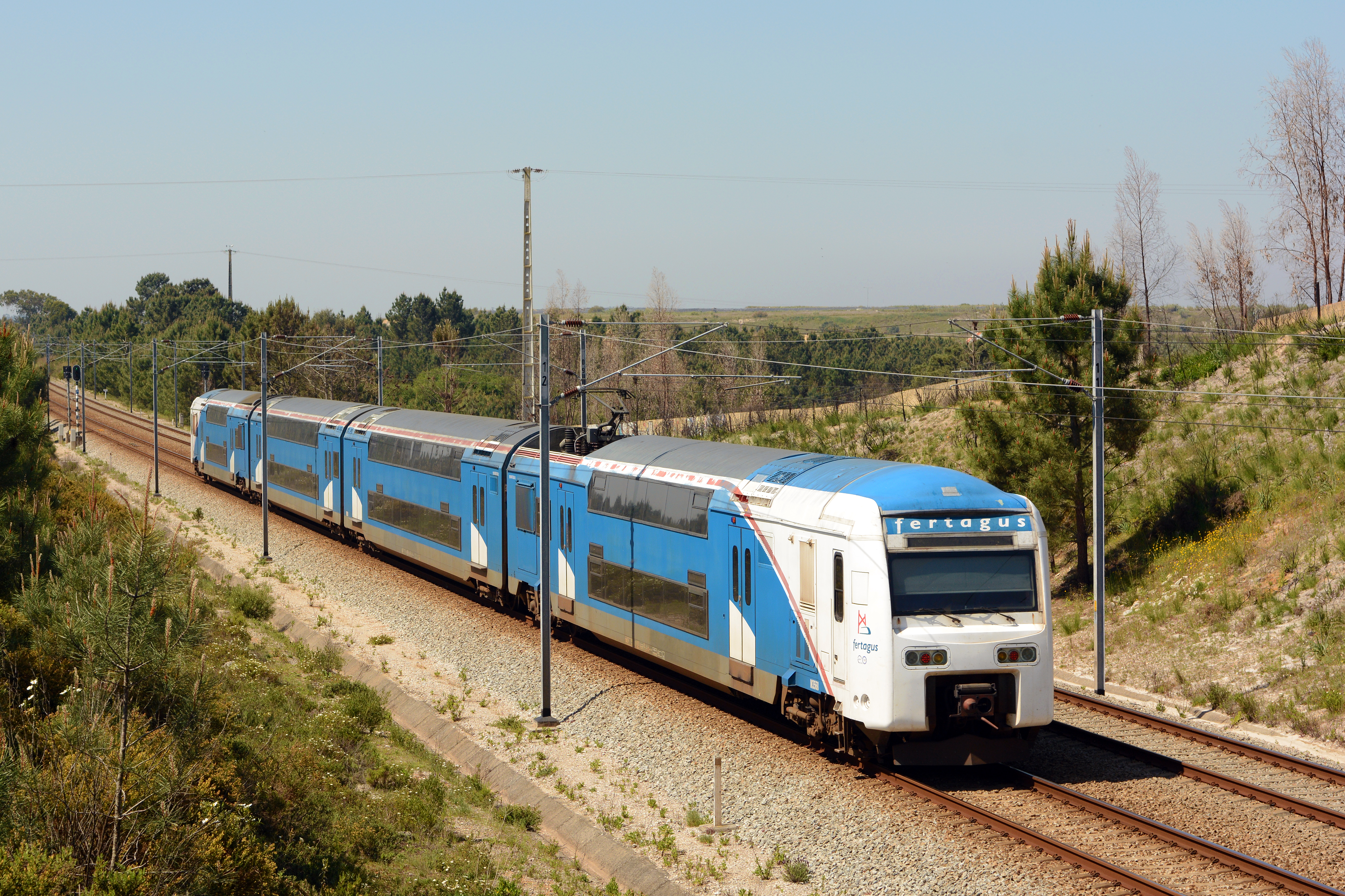
CP Class 3500
