= Compucolor II character set =

Character set

Compucolor II is a character set developed by Compucolor Corporation for their Compucolor computers. These used a SMC CRT5027 video controller, a Japanese-produced version of the Texas Instruments TMS 9927, programmed to provide a screen format of 32 lines with 64 characters per line.

== Character set ==
The following table shows the Compucolor II character set:

Compucolor II character set
	0	1	2	3	4	5	6	7	8	9	A	B	C	D	E	F
0x	�	⎸	⎹	�	�	⎺	�	�	�	�	�	�				
1x					�	�	�	�	�	�	�		╲		╱	⎽
2x	SP	!	"	#	$	%	&	'	(	)	*	+	,	-	.	/
3x	0	1	2	3	4	5	6	7	8	9	:	;	<	=	>	?
4x	@	A	B	C	D	E	F	G	H	I	J	K	L	M	N	O
5x	P	Q	R	S	T	U	V	W	X	Y	Z	[	\	]		_
6x	▒	♞	�	♣	♦	�	�	�	♥	�		♟	�	�	�	�
7x	�	�	♜	♠					╳	�	�	�	◣	�	◢	�

� Not in Unicode, most are pieces designed to make 2x2 character large letters

== See also ==
- Compucolor
- Intelligent Systems
- Intecolor/Compucolor 8001 character set
