= HiFX =

UK-based foreign exchange broker and payments provider

HiFX Group
- Company type: Subsidiary
- Industry: Financial services
- Founded: 1998
- Founders: Shaun Taylor, Laurence Butcher and Matthew Knowles
- Defunct: 2019
- Fate: Merged
- Successor: xe.com
- Headquarters: Bracknell, Berkshire, UK
- Key people: Simon Griffin (CEO)
- Products: Foreign exchange
- Number of employees: 222 (2011)
- Parent: Euronet Worldwide
- Website: www.hifx.co.uk www.hifx.co.nz

HiFX was a UK-based foreign exchange broker and payments provider. It was acquired by Euronet Worldwide in 2014. In 2019 it was merged with xe.com, another Euronet Worldwide subsidiary, and has since been operating under the xe.com brand.

== History ==
The company was established in 1998 in the UK as Halewood International Foreign Exchange Limited by the three founders, Shaun Taylor, Laurence Butcher and Matthew Knowles with the backing of beverage company founder John Halewood of Halewood International. HiFX went on to become one of the major UK non-bank foreign exchange companies.

== Timeline ==
In 2001 it made its first expansion overseas when it opened an office in New Zealand. This was to become its second largest operation outside the UK and provided services to New Zealand, Australasia and the wider Asia Pacific region.

In 2004 it changed its name to HiFX Plc. That same year it also opened an office in San Francisco to serve the North America market.

In 2008 it acquired New Zealand based 'Currency Online' giving it access to an online payment platform and technology. It continued to operate this under the Currency Online brand.

In 2010 it disposed of its US subsidiary HiFX Risk Management and also its Australian-based risk management consultancy business.

After the death of John Halewood in 2011 the existing company management bought out his 50% stake in the company.

In 2014 the company was acquired by US payment company Euronet Worldwide for £145m, giving the founders a windfall from their share holdings. Euronet said HiFX would be integrated into Euronet's money transfer business, Ria.

In 2017 HiFX parent company Euronet acquired XE.com, Euronet later merged the two businesses and this allowed HiFX to provide currency exchange to a new segment of clients.

== Services ==
The company provided foreign exchange and international money transfer services to individuals and corporate customers. One of its specialist areas was in providing money transfer services for overseas property purchase and emigration. In January 2019, HiFX was merged with XE.com and took on the xe.com brand.

== See also ==
- ChangeGroup
- Foreign exchange company
