= Compucolor =

Series of color microcomputers

Compucolor is a series of color microcomputers introduced by Compucolor Corporation of Norcross, Georgia. It was the first color home computer system with built-in color graphics and floppy-based data storage. It used the Intel 8080 CPU.

The first model was an upgrade kit for the company's color computer terminal, turning the Intecolor 8001 into the Compucolor 8001 by adding more RAM and a number of optional storage systems. Released in 1976, the 8001 was soon replaced by the Compucolor II in 1977, although shipments did not start until the next year. The Compucolor II was smaller, less expensive, and used the newly introduced 5.25-inch floppy disks instead of the former 8-inch models.

Compucolor opened its first retail computer store in Norcross, Georgia USA in 1979, aptly named the "Compucolor Computer Store." The store had limited success in the six months of operation, and the store concept was abandoned. By 1983, Compucolor was out of business.

Compucolor, and its forerunner, Intecolor, produced three computer designs (Intecolor 8001, Compucolor 8001 and Compucolor II) over the life of the parent company, Intelligent Systems Corporation. ISC formed in 1973 to produce color terminals.

== Intecolor 8001 ==
Intecolor 8001
- Manufacturer: Intelligent Systems Corporation
- Type: Home Computer
- Released: Created in 1973, released in February 1976;
- Lifespan: December 1976
- Operating system: Compucolor FCS
- CPU: Intel 8080
- Memory: 4K RAM
- Display: 19" color delta-gun CRT, 192x160 dots
- Input: Keyboard
- Connectivity: RS232
- Successor: Compucolor 8001

Intelligent Systems Corporation's first product was the Intecolor 8001, an intelligent terminal based on the Intel 8080. Released some time in early 1976, it consisted of a $1,395 kit based around a 19-inch RCA delta-gun CRT and came with 4 KB of random-access memory (RAM). The monitor's three separate electron guns produced a bright and colorful picture, but had the disadvantage of requiring constant adjustment to keep the guns properly aligned.

It offered a graphics display with 192 x 160 resolution and 80 x 48 character text display (in single row height) or 80 x 24 character in (double height mode), in 8 primary RGB colors (see below).

Connectivity was limited to an RS232 port.

The following table shows the Intecolor / Compucolor 8001 character set:

Intecolor/Compucolor 8001 Character Set
| | 0 | 1 | 2 | 3 | 4 | 5 | 6 | 7 | 8 | 9 | A | B | C | D | E | F |
|---|---|---|---|---|---|---|---|---|---|---|---|---|---|---|---|---|
| 0X | NUL | PROTECT | PLOT MODE | CURSOR X-Y MODE | FREE | FREE | CCI | BEL | home | TAB | LF | ERASE LINE | ERASE PAGE | CR | A7 ON | BLINK A7 OFF |
| 1X | BLACK | RED | GREEN | YELLOW | BLUE | MAGENTA | CYAN | WHITE | TRANSMIT | right | left | ESC | up | FOREGND ON FLAG OFF | FOREGND ON FLAG ON | BLINK ON |
| 2x | | ! | " | # | $ | % | & | ' | ( | ) | * | + | , | - | . | / |
| 3x | 0 | 1 | 2 | 3 | 4 | 5 | 6 | 7 | 8 | 9 | : | ; | < | = | > | ? |
| 4x | @ | A | B | C | D | E | F | G | H | I | J | K | L | M | N | O |
| 5x | P | Q | R | S | T | U | V | W | X | Y | Z | [ | \ | ] | ^ | _ |
| 6x | ` | a | b | c | d | e | f | g | h | i | j | k | l | m | n | o |
| 7x | p | q | r | s | t | u | v | w | x | y | z | { | | } | § | £ |

== Compucolor 8001 ==
Compucolor 8001
- Manufacturer: Compucolor Corporation
- Type: Home Computer
- Released: December 1976
- Operating system: BASIC 8001 (clone of Microsoft BASIC)
- CPU: Intel 8080 @ 2MHz
- Memory: 4K to 32K
- Storage: 8-track tape cartridges (optional)
- Display: 19" color delta-gun CRT, 192x160 dots
- Connectivity: RS-232
- Predecessor: Intecolor 8001
- Successor: Compucolor II

In December 1976, the newly formed Compucolor subsidiary released the Compucolor 8001. This was another $1,295 kit that converted an Intecolor 8001 into a complete computer with BASIC on a built-in ROM. When initially booted, the machine starts in "terminal mode" an acts as a glass terminal for its RS-232 port. Pressing Escape+W launches the ROM-based BASIC interpreter, while Escape+P launched the machine code monitor program. It also included a program to aid in aligning the guns in the monitor.

An optional "floppy tape" drive with two 8-track tape cartridges was available for storage, running at about 4,800 bit/s and storing up to 1 MB per tape. The tapes were physically identical to common 8-tracks, but had much less tape on them so they could loop around faster (8-track tapes cannot be rewound). The tape drive proved too slow to be practical, and after even relatively short periods of use the tape would stretch and be rendered useless.

In 1977 they released a floppy disk controller based on the Western Digital FD1771 to support IBM 3740-style 8-inch drives, and in 1978, another supporting 8-inch drives from Shugart and Siemens.

=== Software ===
The original ROM-based BASIC 8001 was a clone of Microsoft BASIC for the 8080, differing only in the way it handled strings, requiring memory to be set aside for them using CLEAR X where X was a number of bytes, and having separate FRE(X) and FRE(X$) to return the amount of general memory and string memory separately. After threats from Microsoft, ISC arranged a deal with the company to supply a licensed version of the language.

== Compucolor II ==
Compucolor II
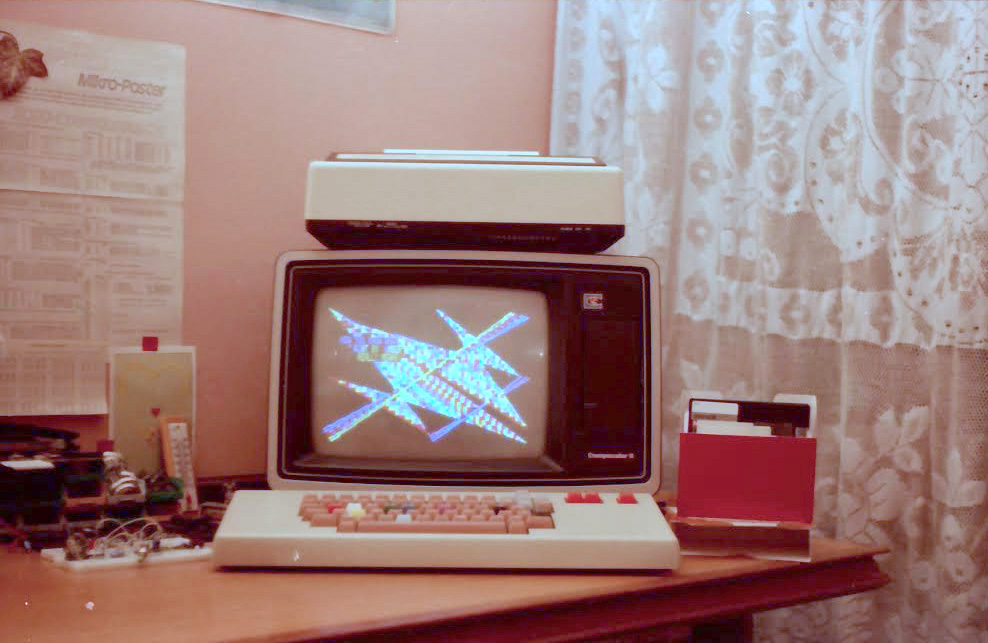
- Compucolor II computer with Centronics 737 printer (Zagreb, 1980)
- Manufacturer: Compucolor Corporation
- Type: Home Computer
- Released: 1977;
- Lifespan: 1977-1980 (Compucolor II)
- Units sold: 1000+
- Operating system: Compucolor FCS
- CPU: Intel 8080A @ 1.99 MHz
- Memory: 8K, 16K, 32K
- Storage: 51.2KB 5.25" Proprietary floppy drive
- Display: 13" color delta-gun CRT, 128x128
- Graphics: SMC CRT5027 (TMS 9927 clone)
- Input: Proprietary parallel keyboard interface, modified EIA RS-232-C modem port, 50-pin custom bus.
- Connectivity: EIA RS-232C
- Power: 120 or 240 AC 50/60 Hz
- Online services: Intelligent Systems Information Service
- Predecessor: Compucolor 8001

In 1977, Intelligent Systems Corp announced the Compucolor II, an all-in-one version of the 8001 system using a lower-cost General Electric 13-inch color television with the tuning section on the right removed and replaced by a 5.25-inch floppy disk mounted vertically. Three models were advertised, the 8 KB Model 3 for $1,495, the 16 KB Model 4 for $1,795, and the 32 KB Model 5 for $2,395. The company did not begin selling the systems until the middle of 1978, by which time the Apple II was widely available with similar specs at a lower price point. In February 1979, the prices were lowered to $1,695 for the Model 4, and $1,995 for the Model 5.

Unlike the 8001, the II booted into BASIC when started. Pressing Escape+D dropped into the "File Control System" disk operating system, and pressing Escape+E returns to BASIC.

=== System description ===
The Compucolor II was based on the 8080 operating at 1.99 MHz clock rate and used a SMC CRT5027 video controller, a Japanese-produced version of the Texas Instruments TMS 9927, programmed to provide a screen format of 32 lines with 64 characters per line (see Compucolor II character set). Internal proprietary ROM firmware allowed a plot graphics array of 128 H by 128 V available in eight colors.

Three available keyboards having 72 (standard), 101 (expanded), or 117 (deluxe) individual keys, attached to the computer with a 25-pin ribbon cable. The keys were full-travel "Cherry brand" type having gold cross-bar contacts with excellent feel and reliability. Key tops were engraved with special legends to help manage computer functions.

The Compucolor II used a custom designed 51.2 KB 5.25" floppy disk drive, which was placed on the right side of the monitor cabinet. The design utilized a serial interface and was referred to as the "Compucolor Drive" or "CD". There were reliability issues with this design since any variance in motor spindle speed would cause difficulty reading or writing floppy media. Also there were a few electromagnetic issues within the cabinet space that interfered with the floppy recording and read process.

The disk operating system known as "File Control System" or "FCS" was designed in-house. In FCS, when a file was deleted, the individual file would be removed from the file list volume and the remaining data would be moved to fill sequential empty space, using the 4 KB portion of display video RAM as a transfer buffer memory. In modern-day terms, files would be automatically defragmented to prevent cross-linked files.

=== Software ===
Most legally available software for the Compucolor II was written by in-house software programmers. 17 software titles were officially released by Compucolor Corporation with custom 5-1/4" artwork title covers: Air Raid, Asteroids, Backgammon, Othello, Blackjack, Bounce, Chess, Cubic Tic Tac Toe, Hangman, Lunar Lander, Maze Master, Sharks, Shoot, Solitaire, Star Trader, Star Trip, and Swarms.

There was also a groundswell of hobbyists and user groups who created software for sale or "shareware" among its groups.

The most important title for the Compucolor II was probably Star Trip, which mimicked the Star Trek genre. Another line of game software was also marketed widely and included titles such as Lightning Command, Target Omega, Freebooter and Bomb Squad.

Productivity software like word processors or programing language interpreters were also available.

== See also ==
- Compucolor II character set
- Intecolor/Compucolor 8001 character set
