= Euronet =

Euronet may refer to:

- Euronat
- Euronet Worldwide, a global provider of electronic payment services
- Euronet (telecommunications network), a telecommunications network in Europe using X.25 (see Packet switching § Euronet)
