= Driver's brake valve =

Complicated valve system for controlling the compressed air brake of a railway vehicle

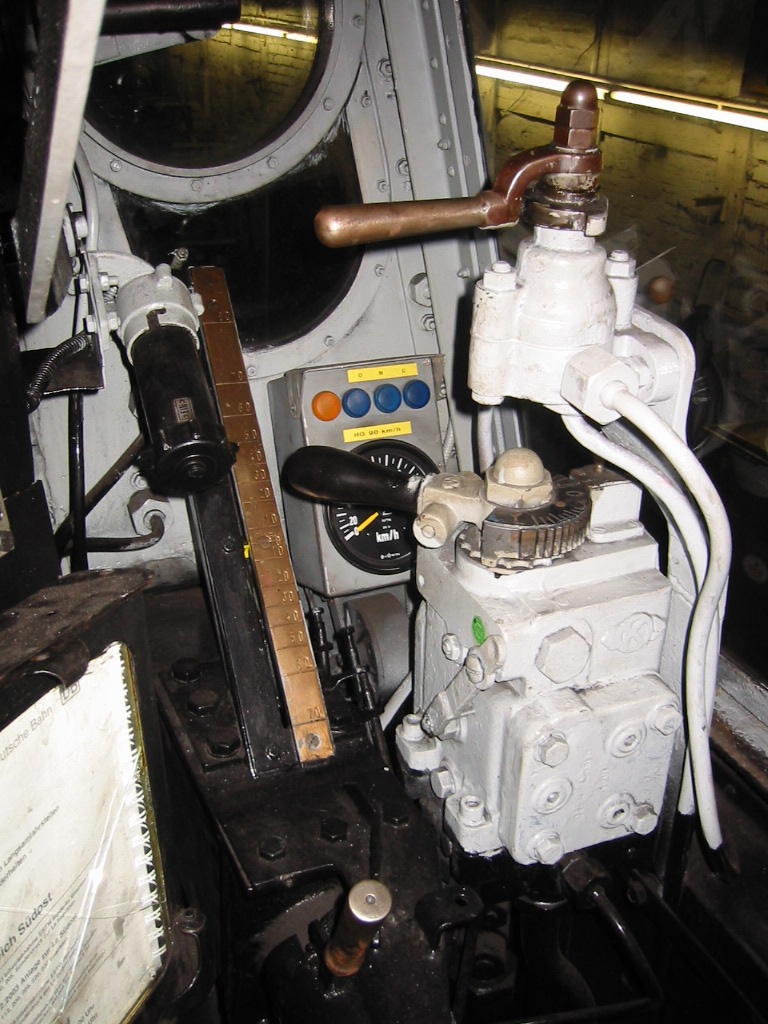
Knorr D2 driver's brake valve (below) and auxiliary brake valve (above) on a steam locomotive

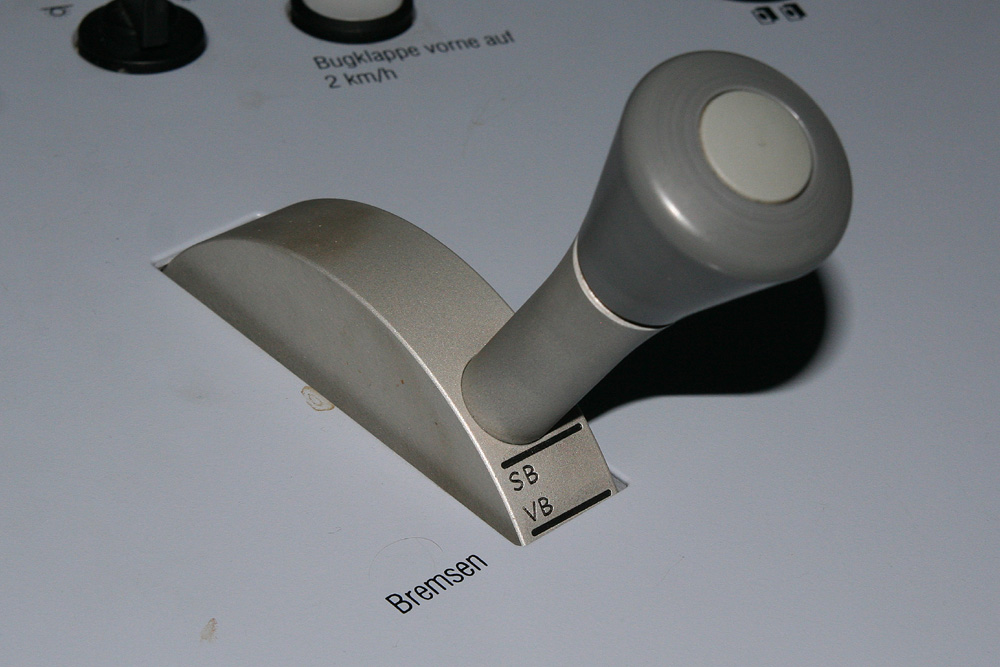
Operation of the driver's brake valve in an ICE T in the maximum braking position

The driver's brake valve is a complicated valve system for controlling the compressed air brake of a railway vehicle. Depending on its setting, it controls whether the brake pipes of a compressed air brake are evacuated and thus whether braking is applied or maintained; or if the brake pipes are connected to a compressed air reservoir, it controls whether the brakes are released again or remain released.

This equipment is found on the footplate of locomotives or in the driver's cab of power cars and driving cars in multiple unit's, hence the name.

In the simplest case the position of the lever controls the extent to which the valve opens, how quickly compressed air can be released from the pipes or the reservoir in the braking system.

The setting of modern driver's brake valves controls the dynamic reduction of the remaining pressure in the brake pipes.
