= XE.com =

Canada-based company

Xe.com Inc.
- Formerly: Xenon Laboratories Inc.
- Type: Subsidiary
- Industry: Foreign exchange services Financial services
- Founded: Newmarket, Ontario, Canada (1993)
- Founder: Steven Dengler; Beric Farmer
- Headquarters: Newmarket, Ontario, Canada
- Key people: Mark Ledsham (CEO)
- Products: Xe Currency Converter; Xe Currency Data; Xe Money Transfer; Xe Currency App
- Number of employees: ≈350
- Parent: Euronet Worldwide
- Website: www.xe.com

Xe.com (Xe) is a Canada-based online foreign exchange tools and services company headquartered in Newmarket, Ontario. It is best known for its online currency converter application that offers exchange rate information, international money transfers, and other currency-related services via its website, mobile apps, and other online channels. It has been a subsidiary of Euronet Worldwide since 2015.

As of 2013, independent ranking site Alexa ranked Xe in the top 500 of all sites worldwide by traffic, and a top 100 traffic site in Ireland, South Africa, and the UAE. As of 2016, Xe claimed that its services attracted over 280 million unique visitors annually.

== History ==
Xe's name at founding was Xenon Laboratories Incorporated and originally, the company provided computer consulting and Internet services to businesses. In December 1994, the company registered the domain name Xe.com, choosing the letters Xe from the two-letter atomic symbol for Xenon. A year later, the company launched a currency converter, providing live currency information online.

In early 2001, as the Internet became more prevalent, the company formally changed its name to Xe.com Inc. and focused its efforts on its website and online currency tools. In 2002, Xe launched an international money transfer service called Xe Trade. In 2016, Xe Trade was rebranded as Xe Money Transfer. Offered online, this service allows both consumers and businesses to send funds internationally.

On July 6, 2015, electronic payments provider Euronet Worldwide, Inc. announced that it had acquired Xe.

In December 2018, Xe merged with sister company HiFX and the two companies will continue to do business under the Xe brand name.

== Services ==
Xe.com offers various free online currency tools, including the Xe Currency Converter, which allows visitors to check live exchange rates of any world currency. The website also offers free historical charts and rate tables. The company provides a foreign exchange service (Xe Money Transfer) and a commercial currency data feed service (Xe Currency Data).

Other features include customized converters, a currency encyclopedia, travel expense calculator, and forex currency news. In 2009, the company introduced a free mobile app (Xe Currency) on iOS, Android, BlackBerry, Windows Phone, Windows 8, and Firefox OS devices.
