= Quadram Quadcolor =

Early CGA-compatible graphics adapter

- Release date: 1983; 43 years ago
- Manufactured by: Quadram Corporation

Cards
- Entry-level: Quadram Quadcolor I
- High-end: Quadram Quadcolor II

History
- Predecessor: CGA

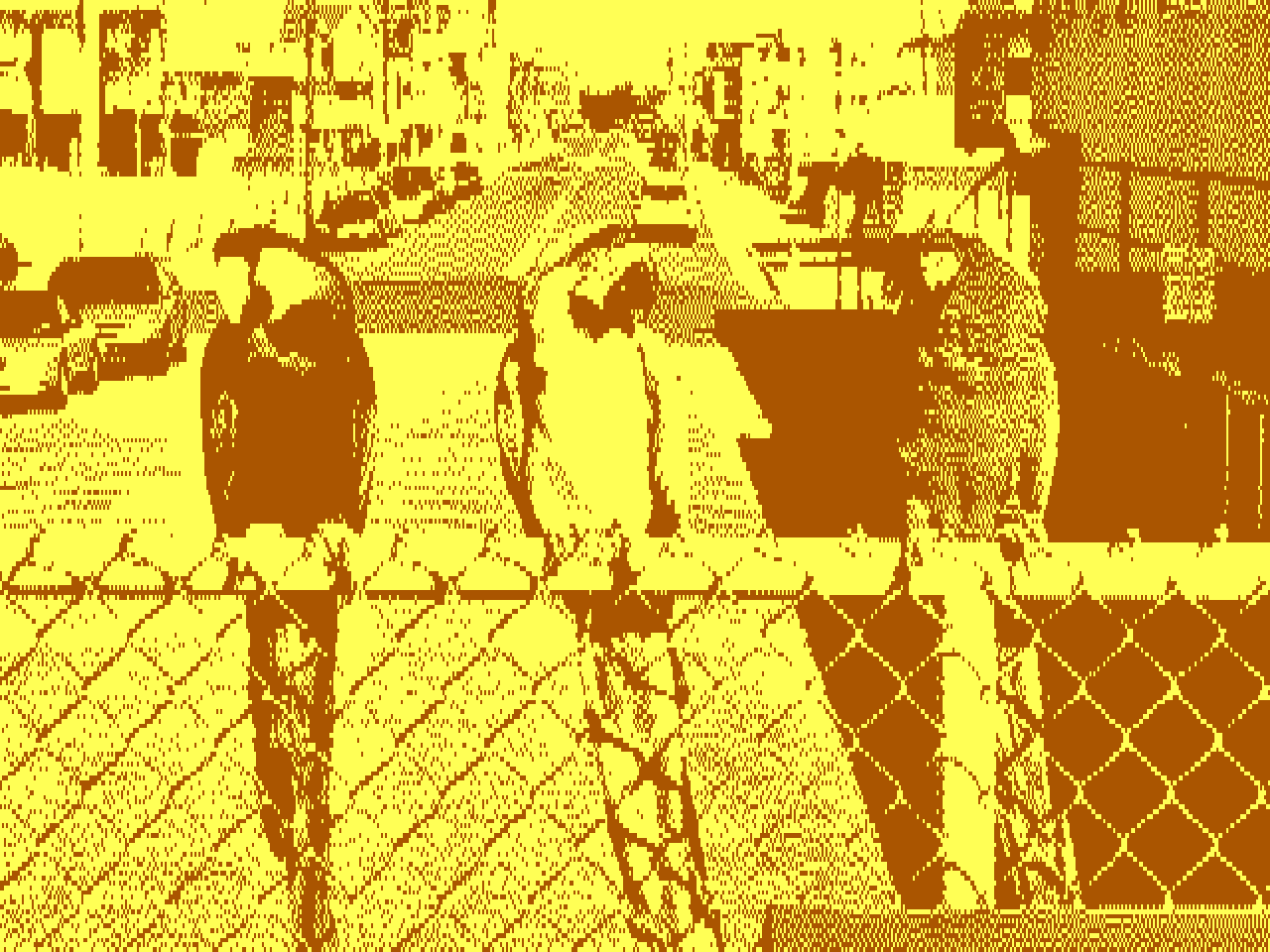
Quadram Quadcolor I in 640 × 200 x 2 colors (aspect ratio corrected)

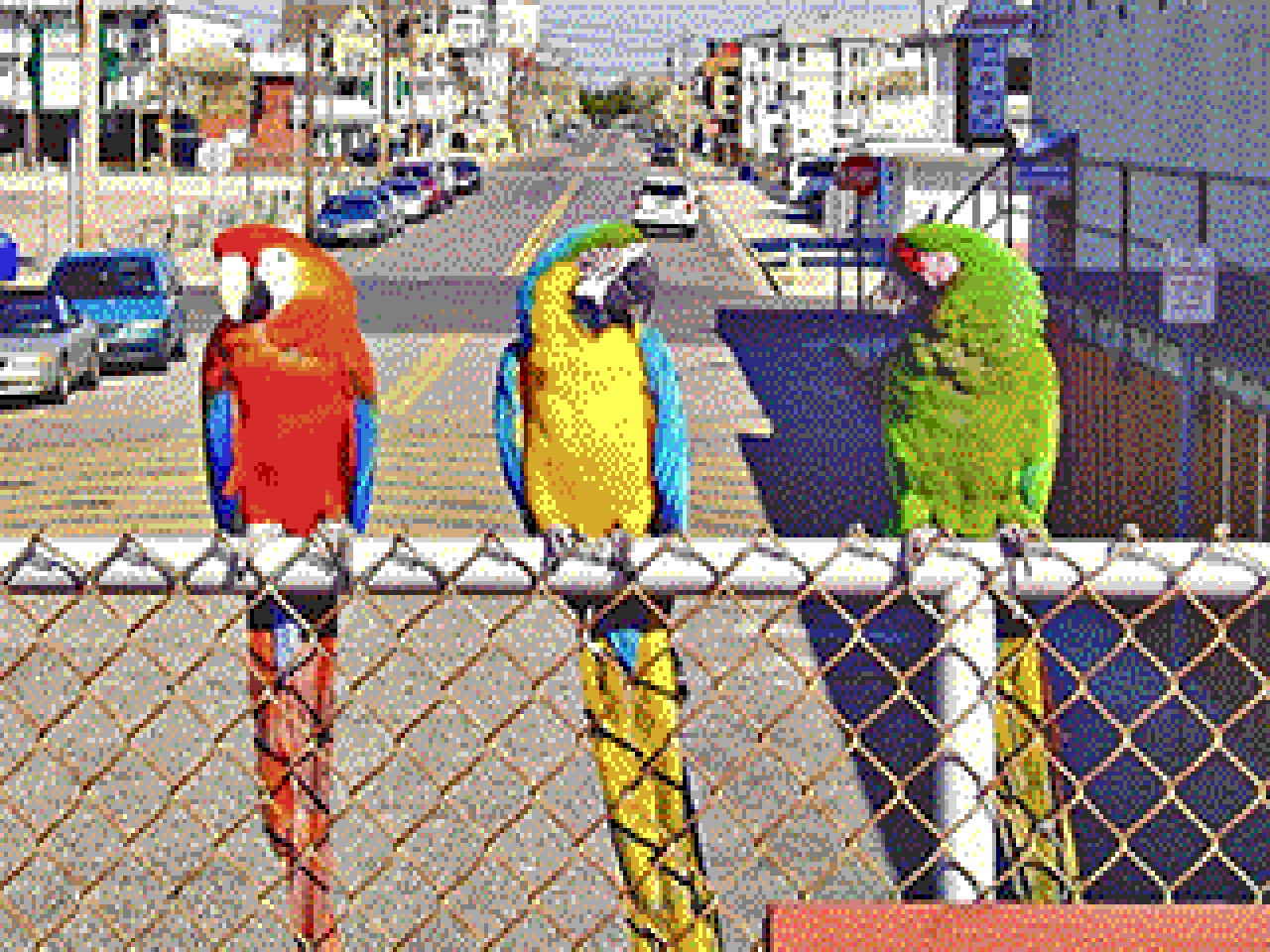
Quadram Quadcolor II in 320 × 200 x 136 colors (aspect ratio corrected)

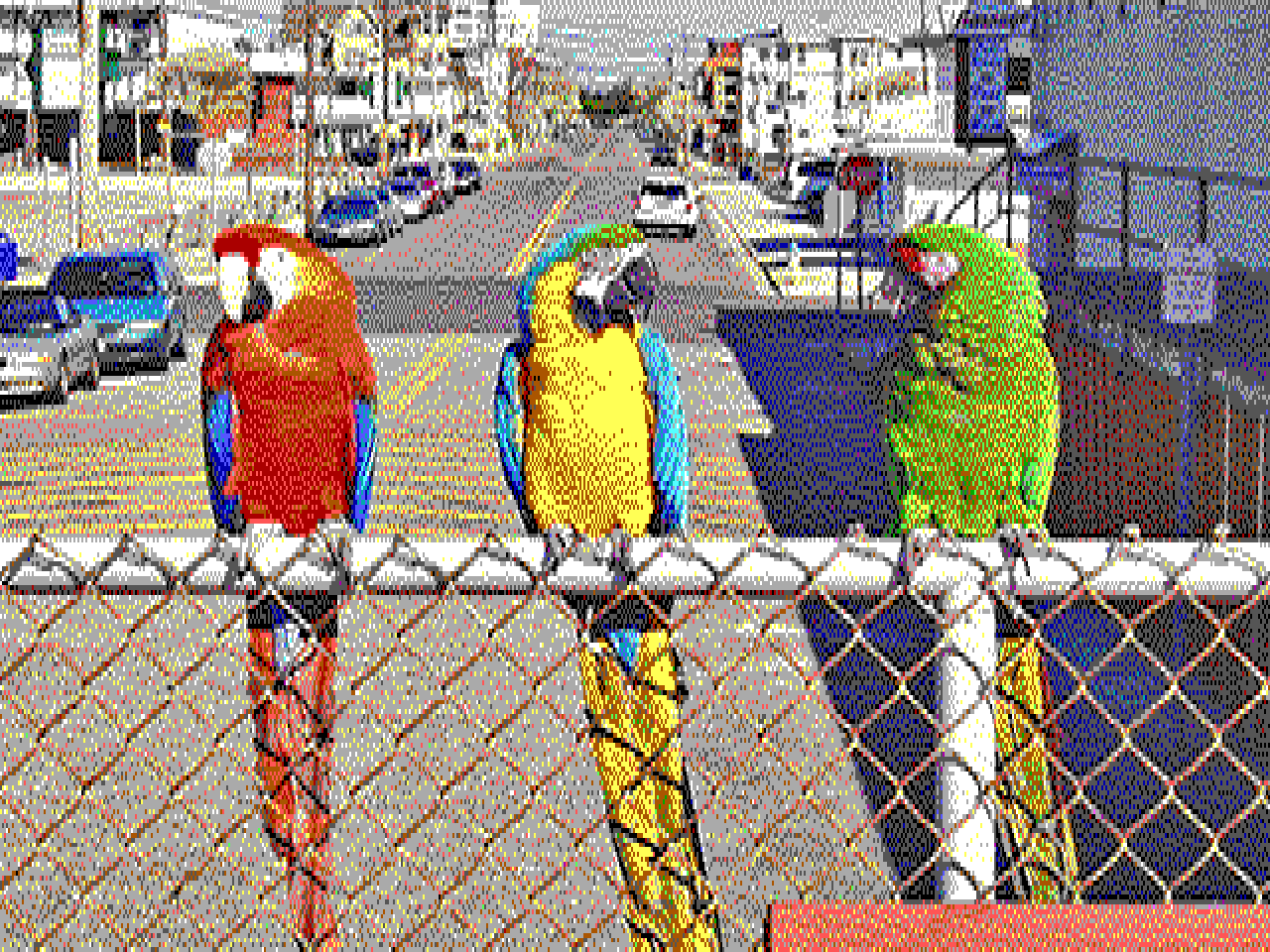
Quadram Quadcolor II in 640 × 200 x 16 colors (aspect ratio corrected)

The Quadram Quadcolor is a graphics card for IBM PC computers by Quadram Corporation, first sold in 1983. It is a superset of the then-current CGA standard, using the same monitor standard (4-bit digital TTL RGBI monitor or NTSC composite video) and providing the same pixel resolutions.

== Description ==
The Quadcolor has twice the memory of a standard CGA board (32k, compared to 16k), and offers a 640 × 200 mode with two freely definable colours. If used with the Quadcolor II enhancement board, the additional memory can be used in graphics modes to double the color depth, allowing for two additional graphics modes — 320 × 200 resolution with 136 colors, or 640 × 200 resolution with 16 colors.

This card is supported by Dr. Halo II and Turbo Pascal Graphix Toolbox.

== Models ==
- Quadram Quadcolor I
- Quadram Quadcolor II

== Output capabilities ==
Quadram Quadcolor I offers the following modes:

- 320 × 200 with 4 colors (standard CGA mode)
- 640 × 200 with 2 colors (from a 4-bit RGBI hardware palette)

With the Quadcolor II enhancement board, Quadram Quadcolor offers the following modes:

- 320 × 200 with 136 colors (obtained from a mix of two 16 color palettes)
- 640 × 200 with 16 colors (4-bit RGBI hardware palette).

== See also ==
- Tandy Graphics Adapter, a graphics hardware system with similar capabilities.
- Plantronics Colorplus
- Hercules InColor Card
- Orchid Graphics Adapter
