= Railway air brake =

Fail-safe power braking system with compressed air as the operating medium

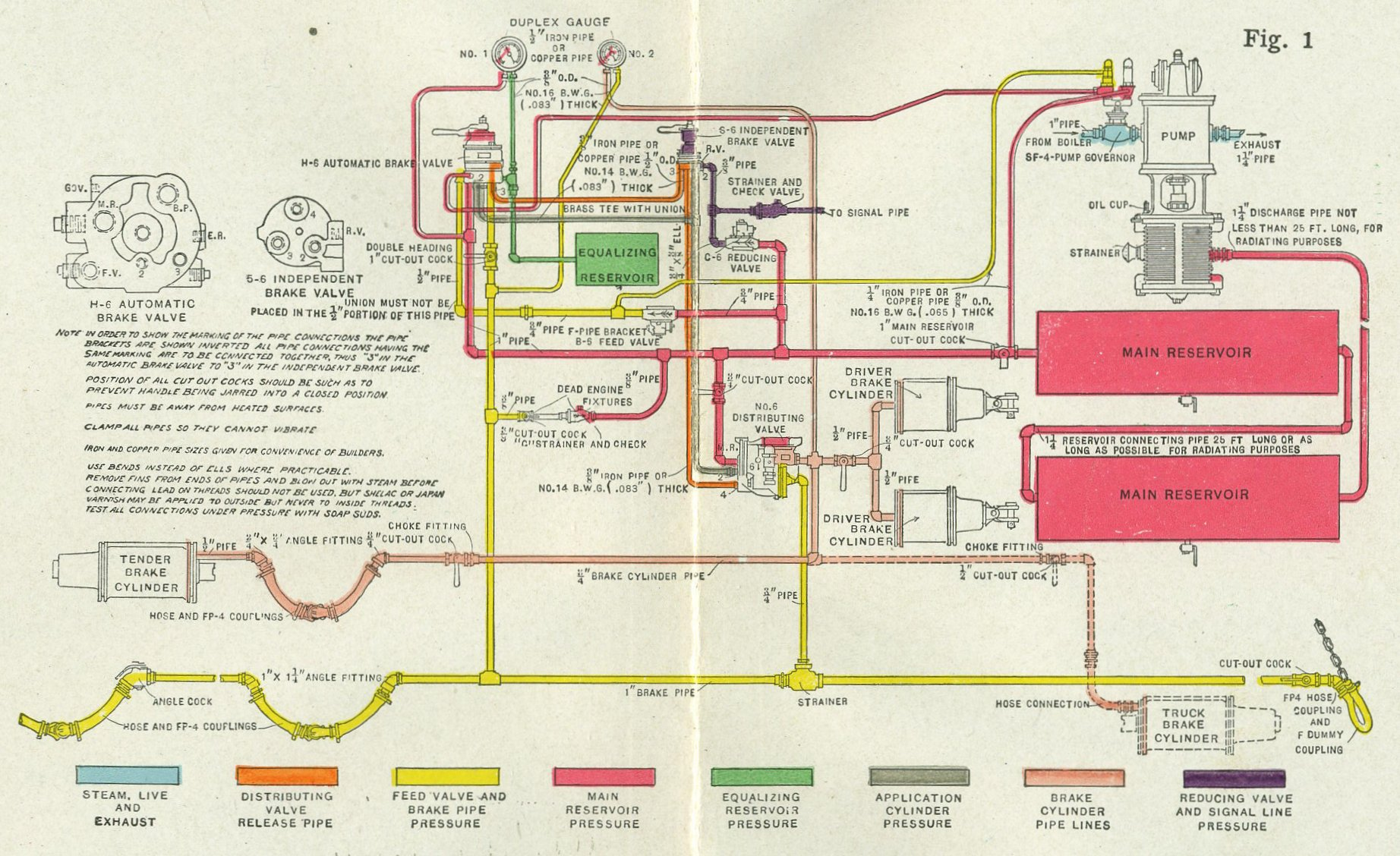
Piping diagram from 1909 of a Westinghouse 6-ET Air Brake system on a locomotive

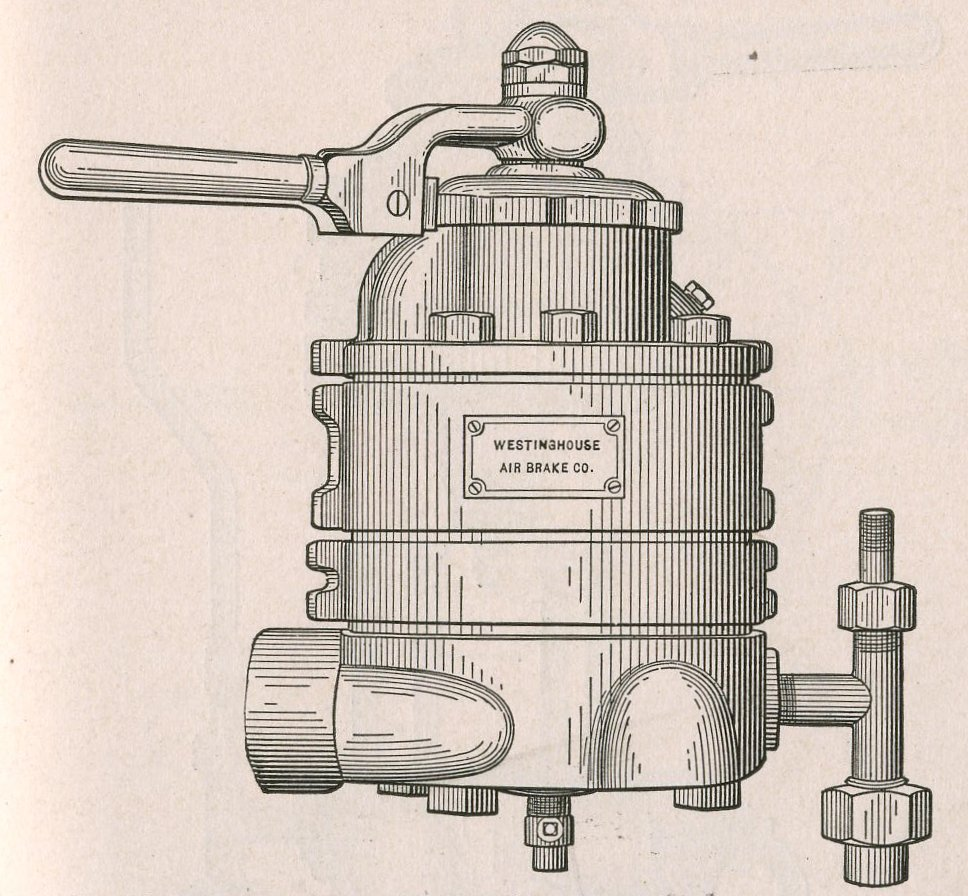
Control handle and valve for a Westinghouse air brake

A railway air brake is a railway brake power braking system with compressed air as the operating medium. Modern trains rely upon a fail-safe air brake system that is based upon a design patented by George Westinghouse on April 13, 1869. The Westinghouse Air Brake Company was subsequently organized to manufacture and sell Westinghouse's invention. In various forms, it has been nearly universally adopted.

The Westinghouse system uses air pressure to charge air reservoirs (tanks) on each car. Full air pressure causes each car to release the brakes. A subsequent reduction or loss of air pressure causes each car to apply its brakes, using the compressed air stored in its reservoirs.

== Overview ==
=== Straight air brake ===
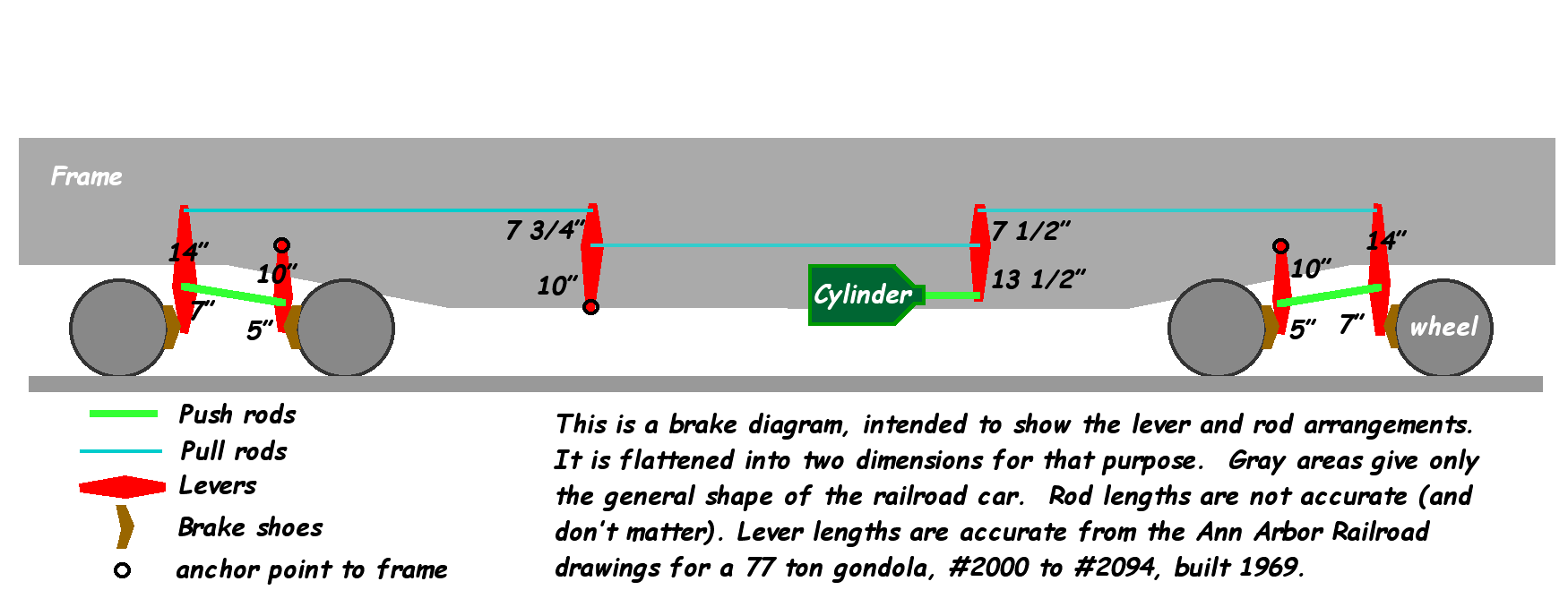
A simplified illustration of a car's brake rigging

In the air brake's simplest form, referred to as a straight air system, compressed air is directed to a brake cylinder, causing its piston to apply force to mechanical linkage, which linkage is conventionally referred to as the brake rigging (see illustration at right). The brake rigging, in turn, is connected to brake shoes that are pressed against the car's wheel treads (some types of passenger cars instead use disc brakes). The resulting friction slows the car by dissipating its kinetic energy as heat. The brake rigging is often quite elaborate, as it is designed to distribute the brake cylinder's force evenly across multiple wheels.

The source of high-pressure air needed to operate the system is an air compressor mounted in the locomotive, the compressor being driven by a Diesel locomotive's prime mover either directly or by electric motor, or by a cross-compound steam engine on a steam locomotive. Compressors of electric locomotives are usually driven by their own electric motor. The output of the air compressor is stored in a tank, also mounted on the locomotive, referred to as the main reservoir. Air from the main reservoir is piped to a manually operated brake valve in the locomotive's cab. When the brake valve is opened to apply the brakes, pressurized air is conveyed to the brake mechanism.

A critical weakness of the straight air braking system is that any failure in the piping, such as a blown air hose, that causes a loss of pressure will render the brakes inoperative. For this reason, train brakes do not employ straight air for operation, as there is no redundancy in the event of such a failure. However, straight air is used to operate locomotive brakes, as redundancy is provided by the ability of a locomotive to come to a stop by reversing propulsion in an emergency, a procedure referred to as "plugging".

An independent brake valve controls locomotive brakes, so-named because the locomotive brakes may be applied or released independently from the train brakes.

=== Westinghouse air brake ===
To design a braking system without the shortcomings of the straight air system, Westinghouse invented an arrangement in which each piece of railroad rolling stock was equipped with a dual-compartment, compressed-air reservoir and a triple valve, also known as a control valve. A pipe referred to as the brake pipe was fitted to each car to act as a passage for the compressed air needed to make the system function. The brake pipes were fitted with hoses at each end of each car and locomotive for creating a continuous brake pipe connection throughout the train.

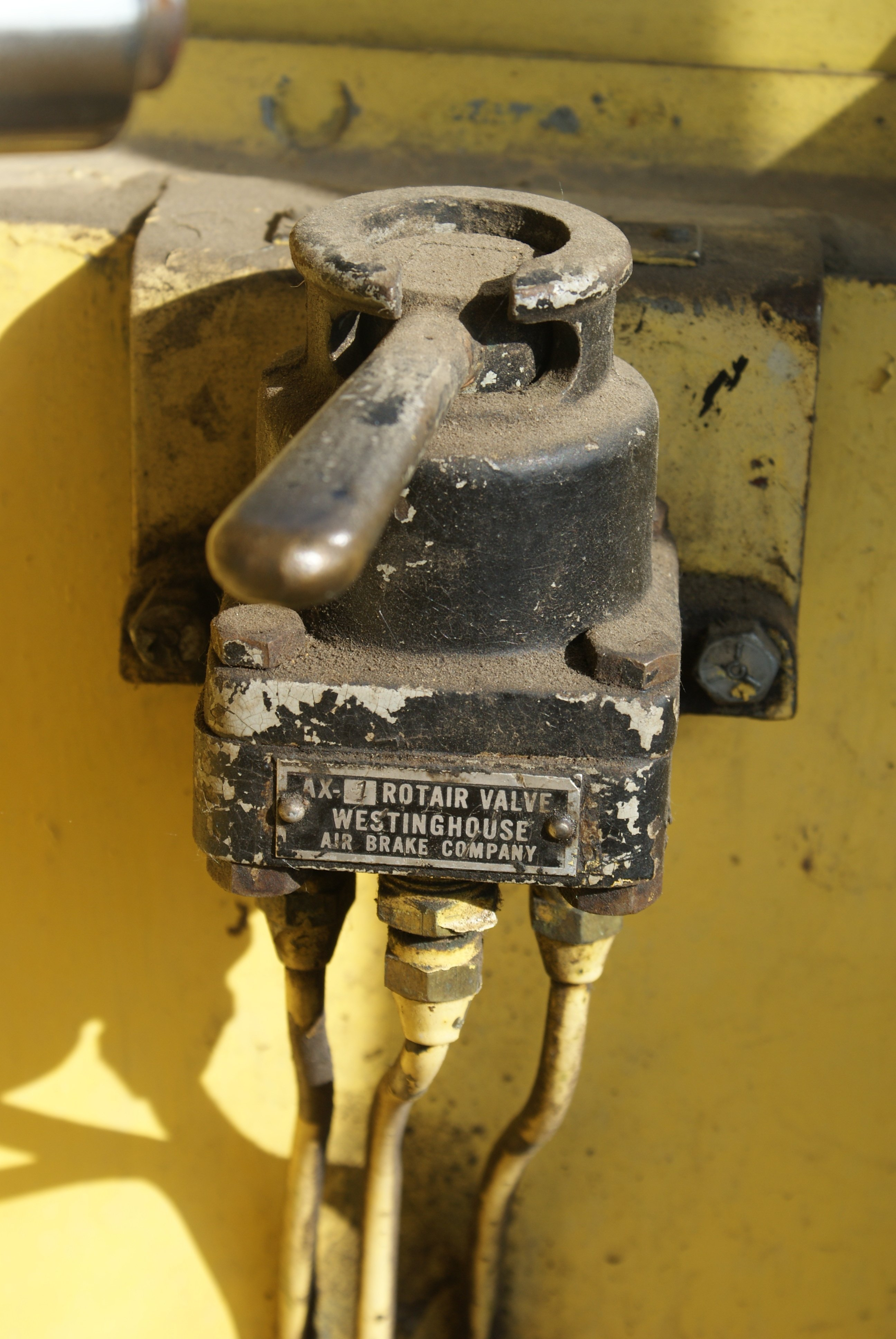
Rotair Valve from the Westinghouse Air brake Company

Unlike the previously described straight air system, the Westinghouse system uses a reduction in brake pipe air pressure to apply the brakes indirectly.

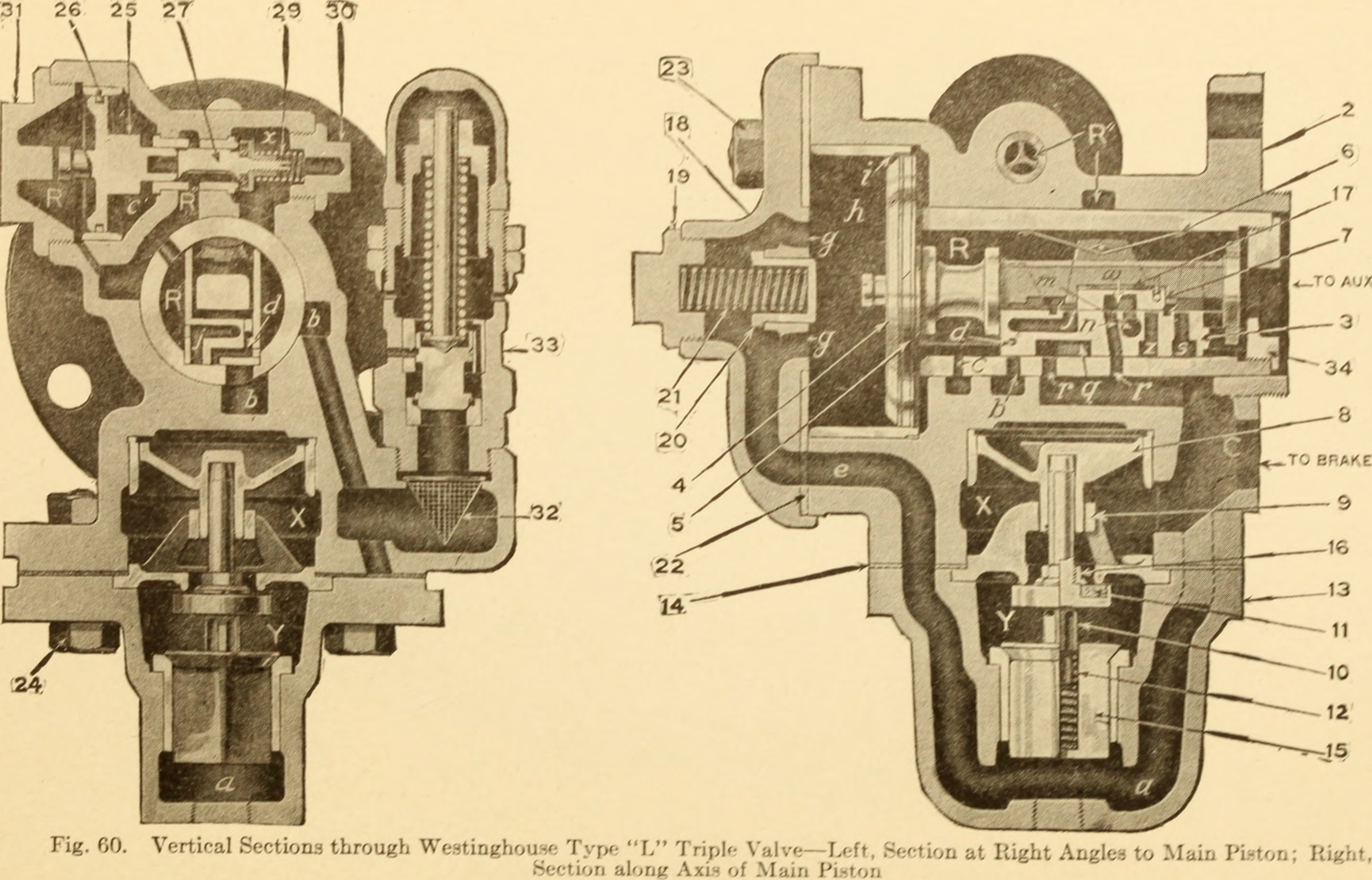
1918 drawing of a triple valve

In his patent application, Westinghouse refers to his 'triple-valve device' because of its three component valvular parts: the diaphragm-operated poppet valve feeding reservoir air to the brake cylinder, the reservoir charging valve, and the brake cylinder release valve. Westinghouse soon improved the device by removing the poppet valve action. These three components became the piston valve, the slide valve, and the graduating valve.

The Westinghouse system functions as follows:

- When brake pipe pressure is reduced below car reservoir pressure at a controlled rate (referred to as a "service reduction", which is usually initiated by the train operator to slow or stop the train), the triple valve will close the brake cylinder exhaust port and open a port connecting the service compartment of the (dual-compartment) reservoir to the cylinder, charging the latter with air from the former and causing a brake application. Cylinder charging will continue until brake pipe and reservoir pressures have equalized. At that time, the triple valve will seal ("lap off") the reservoir-to-cylinder port to maintain cylinder pressure.
- When brake pipe pressure is increased above the car reservoir pressure, the triple valve will open the brake cylinder exhaust port, venting the cylinder to the atmosphere and hence releasing the brakes. Simultaneously, the triple valve will open a port from the reservoir to the brake pipe, thereby recharging both reservoir compartments. When reservoir and brake pipe pressures have equalized, the triple valve will close the port connecting the brake pipe to the reservoir. The reservoir will be sealed off from both the brake pipe and the brake cylinder, and should be able to maintain pressure until needed again.
- When brake pipe pressure is reduced below the car reservoir pressure at an uncontrolled rate, an emergency brake application will occur. The triple valve will open an unlapped port connecting the emergency compartment of the car's reservoir to the brake cylinder. The sudden application of full reservoir pressure to the brake cylinder will produce the maximum possible braking force (occasionally causing wheel slide). At the same time, the triple valve will locally vent the brake pipe to the atmosphere, which will increase the rate at which the sudden pressure loss propagates throughout the train.
  Local venting action is necessary because, without it, the rate at which brake pipe pressure can be reduced through the automatic brake valve (if the engineer (driver) initiated the emergency application) or a blown or disconnected air hose might not be fast enough to trigger an emergency response on more than a few cars. If the pressure loss was due to, for example, a blown air hose at the front of a 100-car freight train and there was no local venting, the triple valves on many cars farther back in the train might not trigger an emergency response, or the response might be significantly delayed. Cars nearest to the front would forcefully apply their brakes well before the cars farther back, causing a "run-in", an abrupt and violent bunching of train slack that could lead to a derailment.

Due to its design, the Westinghouse system is inherently fail-safe, in that any uncommanded loss of brake pipe pressure, such as the aforementioned blown air hose, will cause an immediate brake application.

=== Modern systems ===
Modern air brake systems serve two functions:

- Service braking applies and releases the brakes during normal operations.
- Emergency braking rapidly applies the brakes in the event of a brake pipe failure or an emergency application by the engine operator or passenger emergency alarm/cord/handle.

When the train brakes are applied during normal operation, the engine operator makes a "service application" or a "service rate reduction", which means that the brake pipe pressure reduces at a controlled rate. It takes several seconds for the brake pipe pressure to drop and, consequently, for the brakes to apply throughout the train. The speed of pressure changes during a service reduction is limited by the compressed air's ability to overcome the flow resistance of the relatively-small-diameter pipe and numerous elbows throughout the length of the train, and the relatively-small exhaust port on the head-end locomotive, which means the brakes of the rearmost cars will apply sometime after those of the forward-most cars apply, so some slack run-in can be expected. The gradual reduction in brake pipe pressure will mitigate this effect.

Modern locomotives employ two air brake systems. The system that controls the brake pipe is called the automatic brake and provides service and emergency braking control for the entire train. The locomotive(s) at the head of the train (the "lead consist") have a secondary system called the independent brake. The independent brake is a "straight air" system that allows the head-of-train locomotive to apply the brakes independently of the automatic brake, providing more nuanced train control. The two braking systems may interact differently, depending on the locomotive builder's or the railroad's preference. In some systems, the automatic and independent applications will be additive; in some systems, the greater of the two will apply to the locomotive consist. The independent system also provides a 'bail-off' mechanism that releases the brakes on the lead locomotives without affecting the brake application on the rest of the train.

In the event the train needs to make an emergency stop, the engine operator can make an "emergency application," which rapidly vents all brake pipe pressure to the atmosphere, resulting in a faster application of the train's brakes. An emergency application also occurs when the brake pipe loses integrity, as all air is immediately vented to the atmosphere.

An emergency brake application adds a component to each car's air brake system. The triple valve is divided into two portions: the service section, which contains the mechanism used for brake applications during service reductions, and the emergency section, which senses the faster emergency reduction in train line pressure. In addition, each car's air brake reservoir is divided into two sections—the service and emergency portions—and is known as the "dual-compartment reservoir". Normal service applications transfer air pressure from the service section to the brake cylinder. In contrast, emergency applications direct all air from both sections of the dual-compartment reservoir to the brake cylinder, resulting in a 20 to 30 percent stronger application.

The higher rate of brake pipe pressure reduction activates the emergency portion of each triple valve. Due to the length of trains and the small diameter of the brake pipe, the rate of reduction is highest near the front of the train (in the case of an engine operator-initiated emergency application) or near the break in the brake pipe (in the case of loss of brake pipe integrity). The farther away from the source of the emergency application, the greater the reduction rate can be before triple valves will not detect the application as an emergency reduction. To prevent this, each triple valve's emergency portion contains an auxiliary vent port that, when activated by an emergency application, locally vents the brake pipe pressure directly to the atmosphere. This serves to vent the brake pipe more rapidly and hasten the propagation of the emergency reduction rate along the entire length of the train.

Use of distributed power (i.e., remotely controlled locomotive units mid-train and/or at the rear end) somewhat mitigates the time-lag problem with long trains, because a telemetered radio signal from the engine operator in the front locomotive commands the distant units to initiate brake pressure reductions that propagate quickly through nearby cars.

=== Distributors ===
Many modern air brake systems use distributors instead of triple valves. These serve the same function as triple valves but also offer additional functionality, such as the ability to release the brakes partially.

=== Working pressures ===
The locomotive's air compressor typically charges the main reservoir with air at 125–140 psi (8.6–9.7 bar; 860–970 kPa). The train brakes are released by admitting reduced and regulated main reservoir air pressure to the brake pipe through the engineer's automatic brake valve. In America, a fully charged brake pipe typically operates at 90 psi (6.2 bar; 620 kPa) for freight trains and 110 psi (7.6 bar; 760 kPa) for passenger trains. The brakes are applied when the engineer moves the automatic brake handle to a "service" position, which causes a reduction in brake pipe pressure.

During normal service, the pressure in the brake pipe is never reduced to zero, and in fact, the smallest reduction that will cause a satisfactory brake response is used to conserve brake pipe pressure. A sudden and substantial pressure reduction caused by a loss of brake pipe integrity (e.g., a blown hose), the train breaking in two and uncoupling air hoses, or the engineer moving the automatic brake valve to the emergency position, will cause an emergency brake application. On the other hand, a slow leak that gradually reduces brake pipe pressure to zero, something that might happen if the air compressor is inoperative and therefore not maintaining main reservoir pressure (as occurred during the Lac-Mégantic rail disaster), will not cause an emergency brake application.

== Enhancements ==
Electro-pneumatic, or EP, brakes are a type of air brake that allows for immediate application of the brakes throughout the train, rather than sequential application. EP brakes have been in British practice since 1949 and have also been used on German high-speed trains (most notably the ICE) since the late 1980s; they are fully described in Electro-pneumatic brake system on British railway trains. As of 2005, electro-pneumatic brakes were in testing in North America and South Africa on captive service ore and coal trains.

Passenger trains have long had a three-wire version of the electro-pneumatic brake, which provides up to seven levels of braking force.

In North America, the Westinghouse Air Brake Company supplied high-speed control brake equipment for several post-World War II streamlined passenger trains. This was an electrically controlled overlay on conventional D-22 passenger and 24-RL locomotive brake equipment. On the conventional side, the control valve set a reference pressure in a volume, which in turn set the brake cylinder pressure via a relay valve. On the electric side, pressure from a second straight-air trainline controlled the relay valve via a two-way check valve. This "straight air" trainline was charged (from reservoirs on each car) and released by magnet valves on each car, which were electrically controlled by a three-wire trainline, in turn controlled by an electro-pneumatic master controller in the controlling locomotive. This controller compared the pressure in the straight air trainline with that supplied by a self-lapping portion of the engineer's valve, signaling all of the "apply" or "release" magnet valves in the train to open simultaneously, changing the pressure in the straight-air trainline much more rapidly and evenly than possible by simply supplying air directly from the locomotive. The relay valve was equipped with four diaphragms, magnet valves, electric control equipment, and an axle-mounted speed sensor, so that at speeds over 60 mph (97 km/h) full braking force was applied, and reduced in steps at 60, 40 and 20 mph (97, 64 and 32 km/h), bringing the train to a gentle stop. Each axle was also equipped with anti-lock brake equipment. The combination minimized braking distances, allowing more full-speed running between stops. The straight-air (electro-pneumatic trainline), anti-lock, and speed-grading portions of the system were not dependent on each other in any way, and any or all of these options could be supplied separately.

Later systems replace the automatic air brake with an electrical wire that runs in a circle around the whole train and has to be kept energized to keep the brakes off. In the UK it is known as a train wire. It is routed through various "governors" (air-operated switches) that monitor critical components such as compressors, brake pipes, and air reservoirs. If the train divides, the wire will be broken, ensuring that all motors are switched off and both portions of the train have an immediate emergency brake application.

More recent innovations are electronically controlled pneumatic brakes, in which the brakes of all the wagons (cars) and locomotives are connected by a kind of local area network, allowing individual control of each wagon's brakes and reporting on the performance of each wagon's brakes.

== Limitations ==
The Westinghouse air brake system is very reliable but not infallible. The car reservoirs recharge only when the brake pipe pressure exceeds the reservoir pressure. Fully recharging the reservoirs on a long train can require considerable time (8 to 10 minutes in some cases), during which the brake pipe pressure will be lower than locomotive reservoir pressure.

If the brakes must be applied before recharging is complete, a greater brake pipe reduction will be required to achieve the desired braking effort, as the system starts from a lower point of equilibrium (lower overall pressure). If many brake pipe reductions are made in short succession ("fanning the brake" in railroad slang), a point may be reached where car reservoir pressure will be severely depleted, resulting in substantially reduced brake cylinder piston force, causing the brakes to fail. On a descending grade, the result will be a runaway train.

In the event of a loss of braking due to reservoir depletion, the engine driver may be able to regain control with an emergency brake application, as the emergency portion of each car's dual-compartment reservoir should be fully charged—it is not affected by normal service reductions. The triple valves detect an emergency reduction based on the rate of brake pipe pressure drop. Therefore, as long as a sufficient volume of air can be rapidly vented from the brake pipe, each car's triple valve will cause an emergency brake application. However, if the brake pipe pressure is too low due to excessive brake applications, an emergency application will not produce sufficient airflow to trip the triple valves, leaving the engine driver with no means to stop the train.

To prevent a runaway due to loss of brake pressure, dynamic (rheostatic) braking can be used, allowing the locomotive(s) to assist in retarding the train. Often, blended braking, the simultaneous application of dynamic and train brakes, is used to maintain a safe speed and keep the slack bunched on descending grades. Care is then given when releasing the service and dynamic brakes to prevent draw-gear damage caused by a sudden runout of the train's slack.

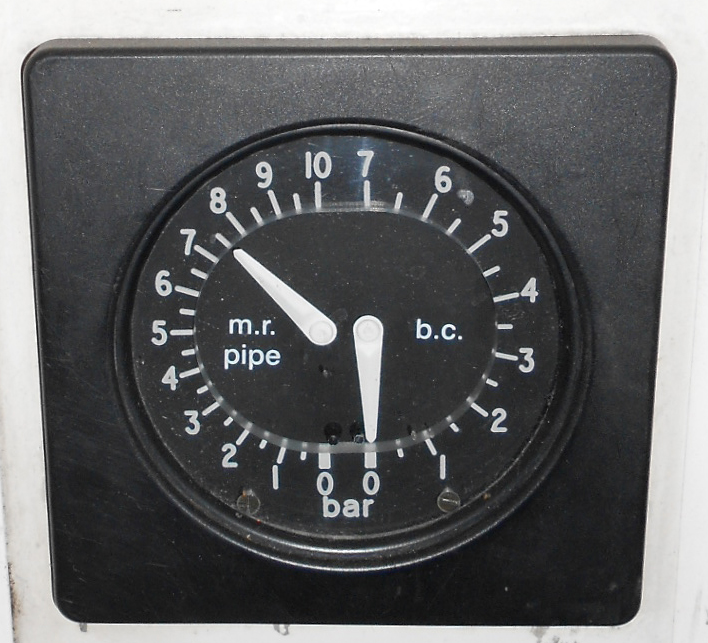
Duplex brake gauge on a British electric multiple unit. Left needle shows air supplied by the main reservoir pipe, right needle shows brake cylinder pressure

Another solution to loss of brake pressure is the two-pipe system, fitted on most locomotive-hauled passenger stock and many freight wagons. In addition to the traditional brake pipe, this enhancement adds the main reservoir pipe, which is continuously charged with air directly from the locomotive's main reservoir. The main reservoir stores the output of the locomotive's air compressor and is ultimately the source of compressed air for all connected systems.

Since the main reservoir pipe is kept constantly pressurized by the locomotive, the car reservoirs can be charged independently of the brake pipe, this being accomplished via a check valve to prevent backfeeding into the pipe. This arrangement helps reduce the above-described pressure loss problems and also reduces the time required for the brakes to release, since the brake pipe only needs to recharge.

The main reservoir pipe pressure can also be used to supply air to auxiliary systems, such as pneumatic door operators or air suspension. Nearly all passenger trains (in the UK and USA) and many freight trains now have the two-pipe system.

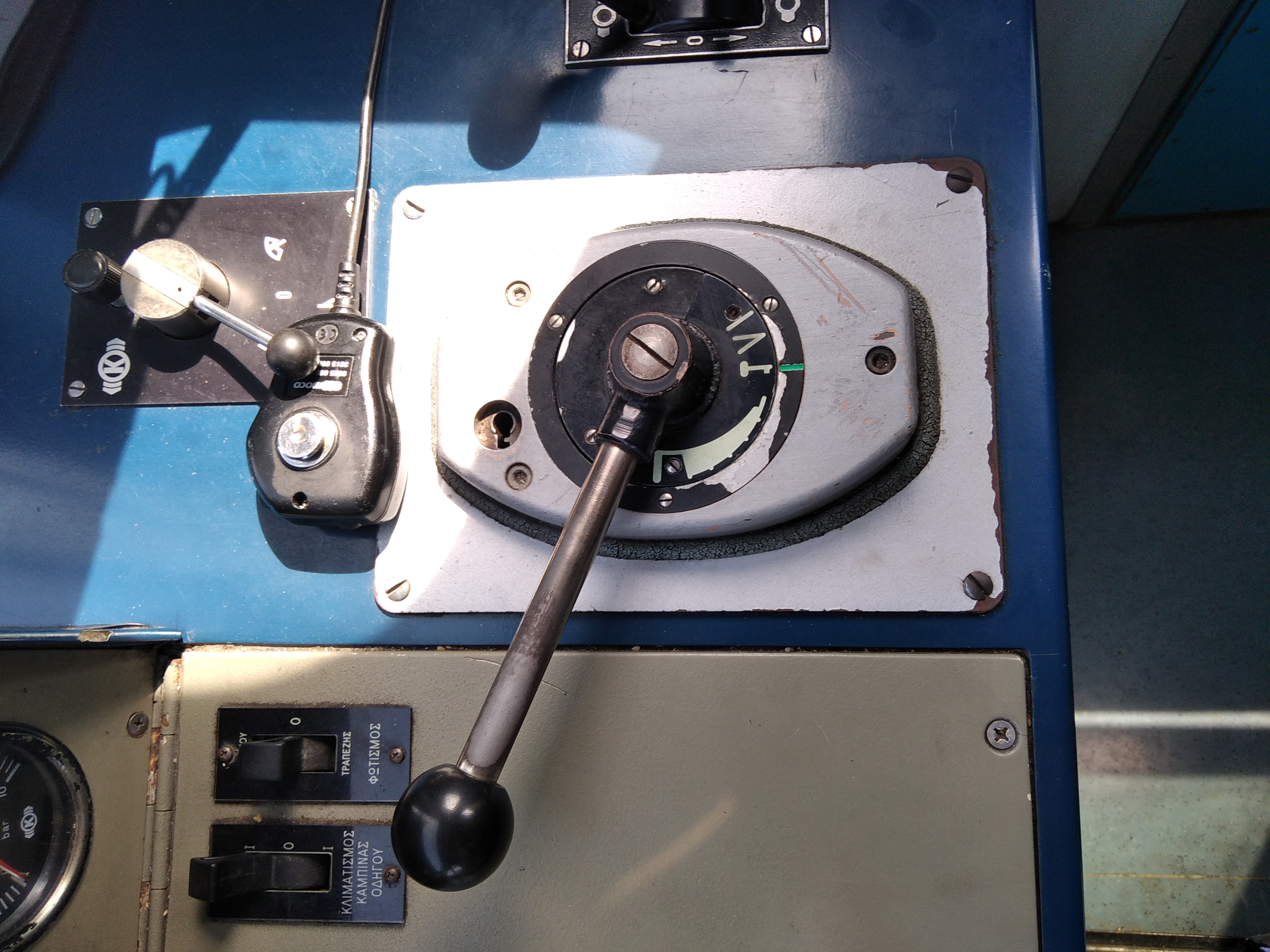
Knorr-Bremse air brake system on a Greek train OSE Class 621 (Bombardier Transportation / Hellenic Shipyards Skaramagas)

== Accidents ==
The enormous weight and inertia of a train, coupled with its very low rolling resistance and the fact that freight (goods) trains often transport hazardous materials, make a brake failure an extremely dangerous event. Brake failure may result in a runaway train and a disastrous wreck, leading to significant loss of life, property damage, and/or environmental destruction.

Ironically, properly functioning brakes may lead to trouble as well. During an emergency brake application, the brakes on empty freight (goods) cars ("empties") may lock wheels and cause them to slide on the rails. If the train is traveling at sufficient speed, sliding wheels will rapidly wear down, causing a loss of tread profile (a condition referred to as a "flat wheel") and overheating. Overheated wheels may weaken and fracture, triggering a derailment. Empty cars in the middle of the train that derail due to damaged wheels may take the cars behind them with them, resulting in a major wreck.

Brake failure may result from human error, mechanical malfunction, or a combination of both, as will be discussed below.

At both ends of each car or locomotive, some valves join the brake pipe to the air hoses, said valves being referred to as angle cocks due to their characteristic shape. When opened at both ends of the car or locomotive, the angle cocks allow airflow through the brake pipe and to the brake equipment. When both are closed, the brake pipe is sealed off, preventing air flow. When only one angle cock is opened, air can only flow in or out from one end of the brake pipe. This last condition is especially significant, as it can inadvertently cause a partial or near-total loss of braking capacity.

During routine train operation, the angle cocks on the rear end of the last car and the forward end of the lead locomotive or car will be closed to seal the brake pipe and maintain air-tight integrity. On a train equipped with an automated end-of-train device (ETD), the angle cock on the rear end of the last car will be opened, so brake pipe pressure will be applied to the ETD—the ETD acts to seal the brake pipe.

While conducting switching operations, one or more angle cocks are closed to isolate sections of the brake pipe when the train is separated to set out or pick up cars. Failure to close the correct angle cock before separating the train will cause an unintended emergency brake application when air hoses are disconnected at the point at which cars have been uncoupled. The emergency application will create a safety hazard if the train is on the mainline and operating under timetable orders, as the authority to occupy the mainline may expire before the train can recharge the brakes, get underway, and move into the clear as another train approaches.

Except for the two end angle cocks mentioned above, all other angle cocks must be opened to create brake pipe continuity throughout the train. If an angle cock on an intermediate car is closed, part of the train's brake pipe will be isolated from the locomotive or control car. Benignly, such a situation may result in the brake pipe downstream from the closed-angle cock losing pressure due to leakage, leading to an uncommanded brake application on the affected cars. More seriously, if the isolated segment can maintain pressure, braking will be lost in the affected cars.

If a closed-angle cock is very close to the head end of the train and the isolated brake pipe can maintain pressure, most of the train will be without braking capability, and the engineer (driver) may be unable to control the train's speed, especially on a descending grade. Such a situation resulted in the 1953 Pennsylvania Railroad train wreck involving the Federal Express. A similar wreck was the Gare de Lyon rail accident, in which a crew member accidentally closed a valve, isolating part of the brake pipe and causing a significant loss of braking capacity.

Some safeguards can be implemented to prevent human error and mechanical problems from causing a brake failure. Most railroads have strict government-approved procedures for conducting air brake tests during train makeup in the yard, or when picking up or setting out cars while en route.

In North America, a typical yard procedure during train makeup, after all air hoses have been connected and angle cocks opened or closed as necessary, is:

- The independent brake in the lead locomotive is applied to keep the train stationary during the following tests. Both main reservoir and independent brake pressures are within the prescribed ranges.
- The automatic brake valve in the lead locomotive is moved to the "brakes released" position to fully charge the system—the charging process may take upwards of 10 minutes with a long train whose cars have depleted reservoirs. Brake pipe pressure is observed to see that it reaches the prescribed level once the system is fully charged. As the system charges, the engineer (driver) may also observe the rate of increase in brake pipe pressure. A too-rapid increase in a long train may indicate that an intermediate angle cock is closed, causing a loss of brake pipe continuity.
- Upon attaining full brake pipe pressure, a small service reduction is made to apply the train brakes. Cars are visually inspected to verify that a brake application has occurred. Particular attention is usually paid to the rearmost car, either by manual inspection or via telemetry from an automated end-of-train device, to ensure that brake pipe continuity exists to the end of the train. The individual(s) inspecting the cars will also listen for the sounds of an air leak—leakage may result in sticking brakes following an intentional brake application, or an uncommanded brake application while the train is underway.
  While the train brakes are applied, the engineer (driver) will observe that the independent brake pressure has increased and will also verify that depressing the independent brake lever will "bail off" (release) the independent brake. This function is essential to proper train handling.
- Finally, the automatic brake valve is returned to the released position, and brakes are inspected to verify that they have released. Also, the fully charged brake pipe pressure is again checked to verify that it has reached the prescribed level.

When setting out or picking up cars en route, a usual practice is to run a modified test—the exact procedure, of course, will be dictated by railroad operating rules and legal requirements.

- If a car or a group of cars, referred to as the cut, is set out from the middle of the train, the test following the rejoining of the train usually involves observing the car that is immediately behind the cut point to verify proper brake operation.
- If a set-out removes the last car in the train, the angle cock of the car that was immediately ahead of the cut will have been closed by the switchman to maintain brake pipe pressure. Typically, testing is limited to observing that full brake pipe pressure is attained when the brakes are released.
- If a cut is picked up, a brake test similar to that conducted in the yard will be carried out, but usually with observation limited to the cut, as well as the check for brake pipe continuity.

When a train is equipped with an ETD, the switchman relocates it to the last car of the remaining train when a cut that includes the last car is set out. Similarly, if a cut is picked up and attached to the rear of the train, the ETD is relocated to the last car of the cut.

Assuming brake pipe continuity is confirmed, an observed brake failure on one or more cars during testing usually indicates malfunctioning triple valves. More rarely, the brake rigging may be at fault. Depending on the train's location during the test, the available repair facilities, and regulations governing the number of cars with inoperative brakes permitted in a train, the malfunctioning cars may be set out or taken to the next terminal for repairs.

== European systems ==
European brake systems vary between countries, but share basic working principles. European passenger cars used on national railway networks must comply with TSI LOC&PAS regulation, which specifies in section 4.2.4.3 that all brake systems must adhere to the EN 14198:2004 standard. This standard is based on and aligned with UIC Leaflet 540, a document ratified by many train-operating companies. UIC Leaflet 540 explicitly approves the following brake systems:

- Oerlikon ESG 121, ESH 100/200
- SAB-WABCO SW 4, C3WR, WU-C, GF4 SS1, GF4 SS2, GF6 SS1, GF6 SS2
- Knorr KKL II, KE, and similar
- Dako CV1nD
- MZT HEPOS MH3f/HBG310 and similar
- Bumar-Fablok MBF-01A, MBF-01B, MBF-02
- Faiveley Transport SW4S and similar, FT SS1 / FT SS2 and similar
- Keschwari Electronic Systems EDS 300

Historically, and according to UIC 540, we distinguish systems technically approved since 1927-1932 such as: Westinghouse W (Note: Railway regulations consider "Westinghouse" as a standalone brake system, however to distinguish from Westinghouse company and other Westinghouse brake systems, railway staff often borrow letter "W" from signs on UIC rolling stock), Knorr K (Note: Railway regulations consider "knorr" as a standalone brake system, however to distinguish from Knorr company and other Knorr brake systems, railway staff often borrow letter "K" from signs on UIC rolling stock), Kunze-Knorr, Drolshammer, Bozic, Hildebrand-Knorr.

In the steam era, Britain's railways were divided–some using vacuum brakes and some using air brakes–but there was a gradual standardization on the vacuum brake. Some locomotives, e.g., on the London, Brighton and South Coast Railway, were dual-fitted so that they could work with either vacuum- or air-braked trains. In the diesel era, the process was reversed and British Railways switched from vacuum-braked to air-braked rolling stock in the 1960s.

Air brakes and components

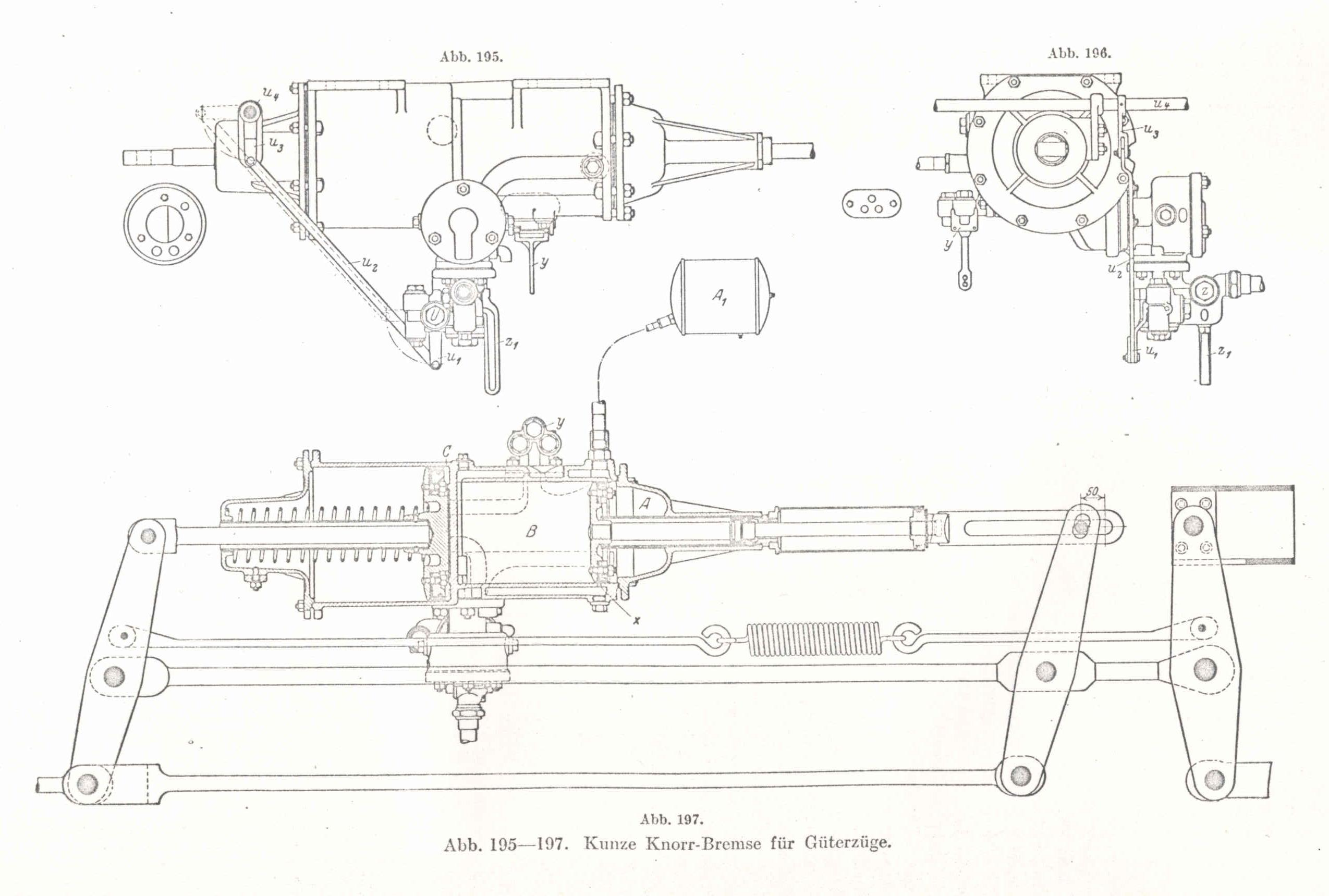
Kunze-Knorr brake system (diagram)

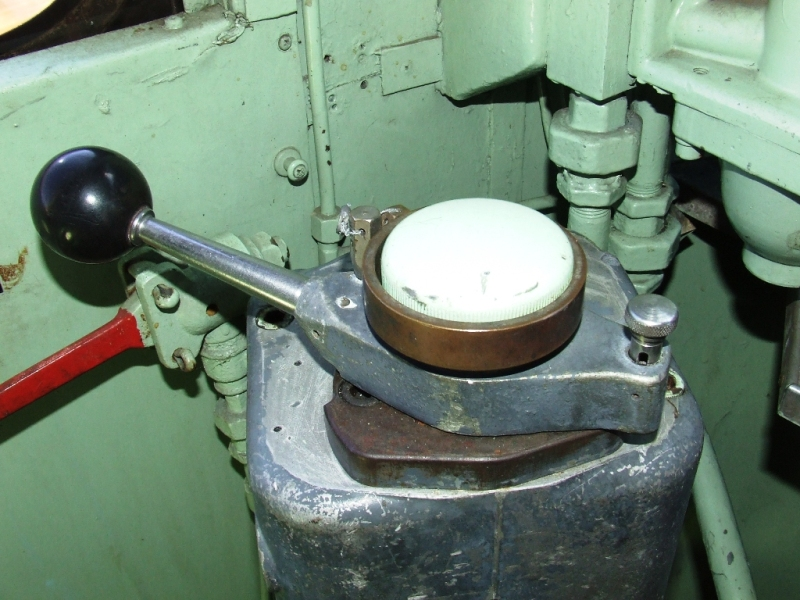
Oerlikon FV4a train brake valve

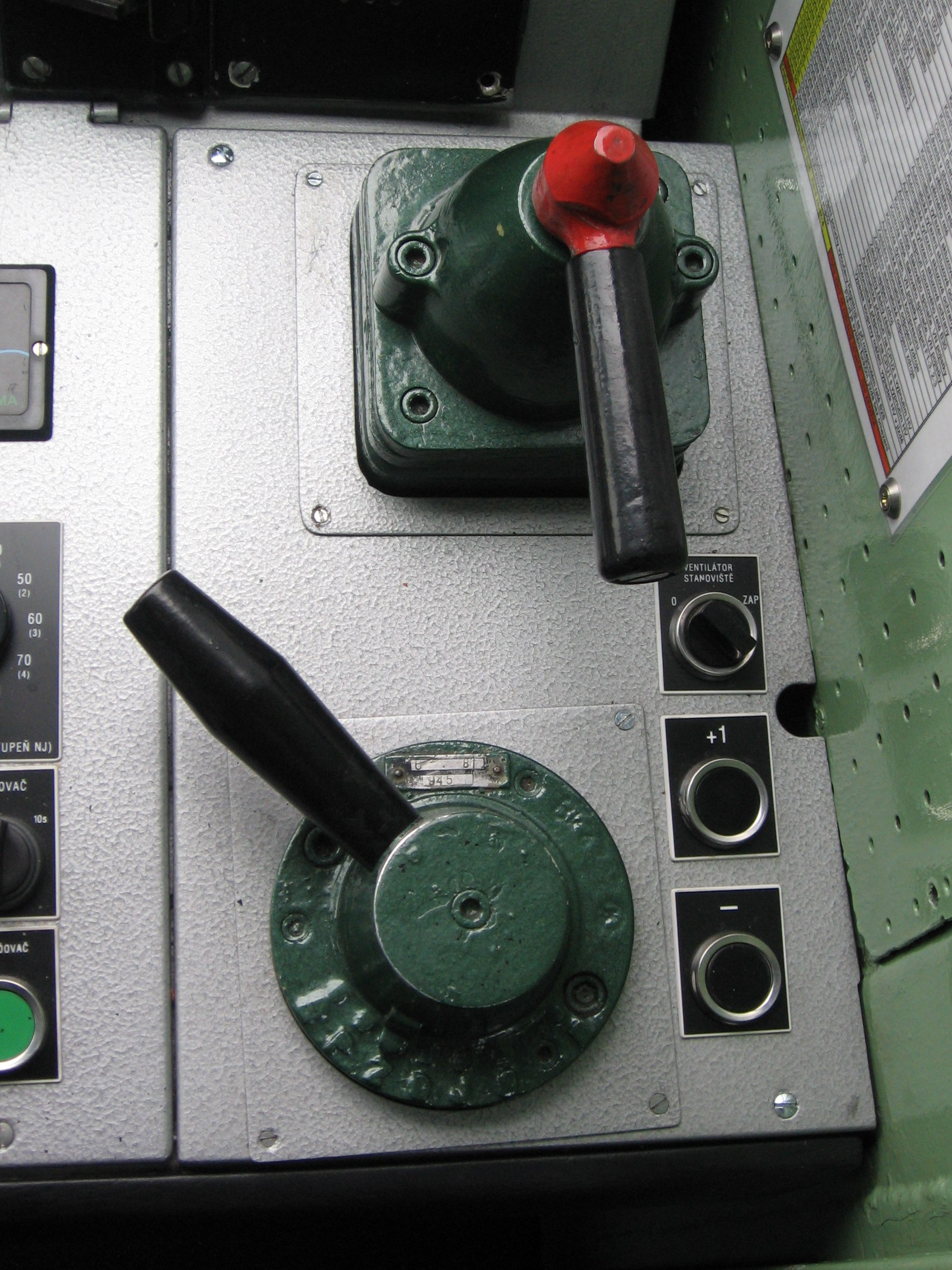
ČD electromechanic Dako BSE train valve and Dako BP locomotive brake valve

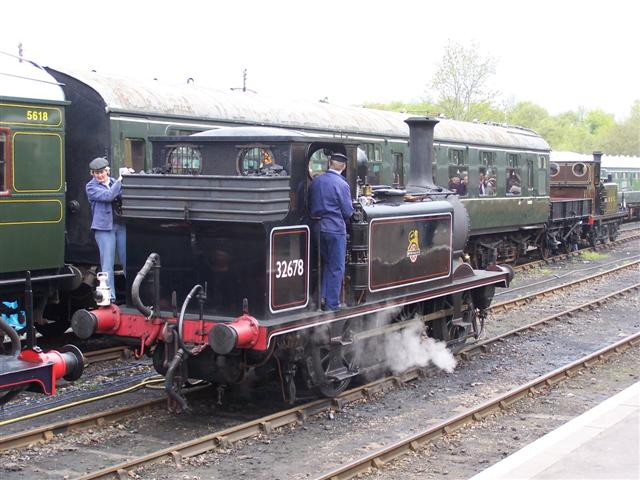
London, Brighton and South Coast Railway locomotive. Note the three pipes: one for the vacuum brake, one for the air brake, and one for the steam heat

== Vacuum brakes ==
The main competitor to the air brake is the vacuum brake, which operates on negative pressure. The vacuum brake is a little simpler than the air brake. Instead of an air compressor, steam engines have an ejector with no moving parts, and diesel or electric locomotives have a mechanical or electrical "exhauster". Disconnection taps at the ends of cars are not required because the loose hoses are sucked onto a mounting block.

However, the maximum pressure in a vacuum system is limited to atmospheric pressure, so all the equipment has to be much larger and heavier to compensate. That disadvantage is made worse at high altitude. The vacuum brake is also considerably slower to apply and release, requiring a higher level of skill and anticipation from the driver. Conversely, the vacuum brake originally had the advantage of allowing gradual release. In contrast, the Westinghouse automatic air brake was originally available only in the direct-release form, still common in freight service.

A primary fault of vacuum brakes is the difficulty of detecting leaks. In a positive air system, a leak is quickly detected by the escaping pressurized air. Discovering a vacuum leak is more difficult, although it is easier to repair, because a piece of rubber (for example) can be tied around the leak and held firmly in place by the vacuum.

Electro-vacuum brakes have been used with considerable success on South African electric multiple unit trains. Despite requiring larger and heavier equipment, as stated above, the performance of the electro-vacuum brake approached that of contemporary electro-pneumatic brakes. However, their use has not been repeated.

== See also ==
- Air brake (aircraft)
- Air brake (road vehicle) – Type of friction brake for vehicles
- Driver's brake valve
- Dual brake
- Gladhand connector – Interlocking hose coupling fitted to hoses supplying pressurized air for braking
- Railway tread brake – Component of railway rolling stock
