= Chromatics Inc. =

US color graphics display manufacturer

Chromatics
- Industry: Electronics
- Founded: 1976
- Headquarters: Tucker, Georgia
- Key people: Terry Hughey, Roger Moonen, Dave Scott
- Products: Color graphic display systems

Chromatics Inc. was a color graphics display manufacturer based in Tucker, Georgia. Their systems predated the personal computer era of inexpensive graphics displays, and were typically used as peripheral devices, connected to a mainframe or minicomputer. In some configurations, a Chromatics graphics terminal could be used as a stand-alone workstation, with disk drives and an operating system.

Chromatics pursued the higher performance end of the graphics marketplace, including such applications as flight simulation and air traffic control. They sold many systems into military and government contracts. Several configurations received Tempest certification. Others were ruggedized to withstand shock and vibration.

== History ==
The company was founded in 1976 by Terry Hughey, who left Intelligent Systems Corporation (another manufacturer of graphics terminals) to focus on higher-end systems. Other principals included Dave Scott (Vice President of Digital Engineering) and Roger Moonen (Vice President of Analog Engineering). Chromatics was acquired by Barco NV in 1990, with Scott becoming president of U.S. operations for Barco.

== Products ==
=== CG Series ===
The CG series included a graphics display, processor, and memory. In its most basic configuration, it would be connected via an RS-232 serial port to a larger computer. Programs running on that "host" machine would generate commands in Chromatics' proprietary graphics language, and transmit them to the CG. Such commands would cause the CG to draw primitive shapes (lines, circles, rectangles, etc.) in various colors, which could be combined to form more complex images. A typical command to draw a circle would be: <02> C 256,256,100, where the single ASCII character <02> (or STX) represents the Plot command, C indicates a circle, and the three numbers represent the circle's X-Y position and radius.

A CG system could also include 8" floppy diskette drives, a disk operating system for storing graphics images, and a version of Microsoft BASIC. These allowed the CG to be used as a standalone workstation, able to generate images without being connected to a host machine. Later enhancements included a Color Lookup Table and arithmetic processing unit.

=== CGC 7900 ===
The CGC 7900 was developed as a successor to the CG. It had a larger display, a more powerful processor, and more displayable colors (256 vs. 8). It retained backward compatibility with the CG's graphics language. A Color Lookup Table allowed each of its 256 displayable colors to be mapped to any of 2^{24} (16,777,216) colors. This enabled smooth shading of certain images, but not true photographic realism. The display hardware also included a text overlay frame buffer capable of displaying 85x48 characters in 8 colors, on top of the main graphic image. Screen resolution was 1024x768 pixels at 60 Hz refresh rate (interlaced).

The 7900 could also be configured with disk drives, including a Quantum 8" hard drive storing 40 MB. The drives could be used for simple file storage, as with the CG. A version of Idris, a Unix-like operating system, was also available.

Entry-level price for the 7900 (without disk drives) was $19,995, for a display system comparable to the XGA displays which would be a standard feature of personal computers less than a decade later.

=== CT Series ===
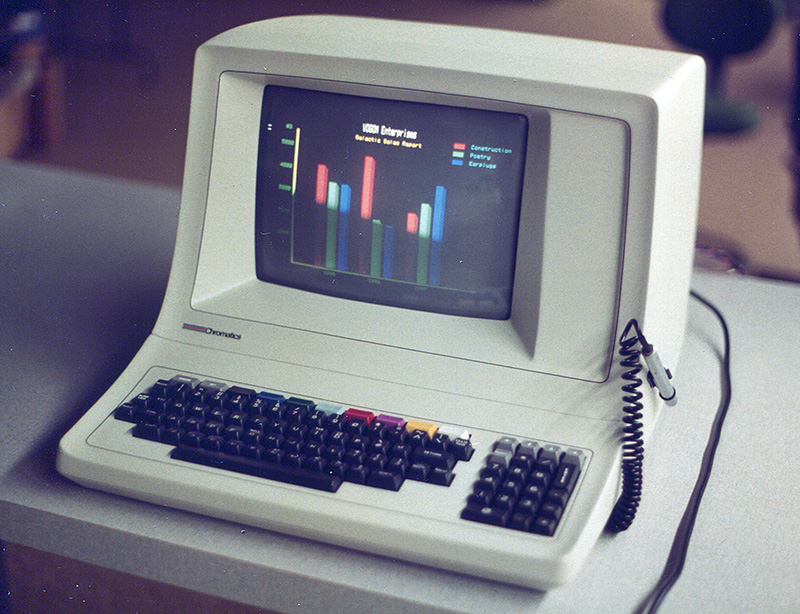
The Chromatics CT4100 graphics terminal displayed text and character-cell graphics in color.

The CT series was a lower-cost product for Chromatics, designed around the recently introduced NEC μPD7220 graphics display controller chip. It was their only product built using a single circuit board. It was also the only series which could not be configured with disk storage and a disk-based operating system.

The CT4100 model had the same form factor as other CT series machines, but was the only Chromatics system with character-cell (not pixel-addressable) graphics. It was intended to directly compete in the process control display terminal market, against Hughey's previous company, Intelligent Systems. Due to the limited graphics flexibility available in this type of display, the CT4100 also included a downloadable character set allowing user-definable glyphs.

=== CX Series ===
The CX series continued Chromatics work at the higher end of graphics display resolution. Models included the CX1536 (1536x1152 resolution), CX2000 (1280x1024 resolution), and CX2500 (2560x2048 resolution with a 29" monitor).

== Feature Comparison ==
	Introduced	Resolution	Bits/Pixel	Colors	CPU	Backplane	Operating System	Display Size
CG Series	1978	512x512	3	8	Z80	Proprietary	Proprietary	14"
CGC 7900	1980	1024x768	8	256	68000	Versabus	Proprietary, Idris	19"
CT Series	1981	1024x768	8	256	Z80	None	None	13"
CX Series	1984	1536x1152 and up	8-24	256-16M	68020	VMEbus	Unix	19" and up

== In popular culture ==
A CGC 7900 system was used to generate preliminary (wire-frame) animation artwork for the Disney movie, Tron.

Both the CG and CGC 7900 systems had large keyboards with dedicated function keys to select colors, choose graphics modes, and perform similar operations. These keys allowed many functions to be performed interactively, without the use of a computer program to generate images. The 7900 keyboard was featured on the cover of Scientific American magazine.
