= Air line =

Tube or hose carrying a compressed air supply

An air line is a tube, or hose, that contains and carries a compressed air supply. In industrial usage, this may be used to inflate car or bicycle tyres or power tools worked by compressed air, for breathing apparatus in hazardous environments and to operate many other pneumatic systems.

Air lines provide compressed air for a wide range of uses and to cater for a variety of uses air lines are manufactured in a range of corrosion-resistant materials. Typically air lines are made with flexible hose or rigid pipe. Air line hoses provide flexibility and mobility for use, whereas a piped air line is more permanent and resistant to damage. For a typical compressed air system, both types of air lines are used in conjunction.

== Air line hose ==
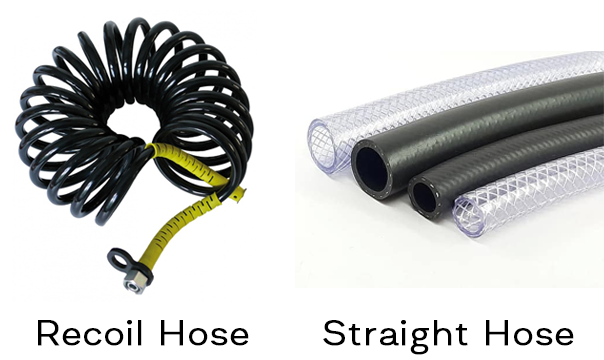
Two types of air line hose

Air line hoses are flexible tubes used to convey pressurised air. They are commonly used for carrying a supply of compressed air to operate pneumatic powered systems, such as a road vehicle air brake system for large vehicles and a railway air brake system for railway carriages / locomotives. Due to the versatility of a flexible compressed air supply hoses are also used for pneumatic hand tools, pneumatic robotics and for connections to air powered equipment. Hose air lines are manufactured with anti-corrosion & abrasion resistant materials, to prevent internal corrosion from air moisture/condensate and from external abrasion when in use. Air line hoses are manufactured in a number of materials, meaning each type of hose can provide different characteristics to suit its use. Some important characteristics include flexibility, weight & manoeuvrability.

Commonly used materials for Air Line Hose

- Rubber – Most commonly used
- Hybrid Material – A combination of polyurethane, PVC, and rubber
- PVC
- Polyurethane

A wide range of hose sizes & materials are available to accommodate the different pressures, flow rates & of its intended use. There are two types of air line hose which are most commonly used. The two types are known as Standard (straight) and Recoil (coiled) hose types. The outer diameter size of air line hoses are manufactured in both imperial and metric unit systems.

== Fixed pipe air lines ==
The term air line is also used to describe fixed pipe compressed air systems. These systems are often found in laboratories, workshops, manufacturing facilities & on other sites for industrial processes. Fixed pipe air lines can also found onboard large shipping vessels, as compressed air is used to rotate the engines for starting up. Large diameter pipework systems are used for air lines that convey compressed air over great distances, these are typically found on large industrial sites & research facilities.

Fixed pipe systems are typically connected to a large industrial compressor, located remotely, in a plant room or dedicated space. The compressed air lines will be piped from the compressor to one or multiple point of use outlets. At the outlet of a fixed air line you will typically find a Pressure regulator installed upstream of the termination/outlet point, this allows the user to regulate the pressure and flow of air to suit the desired use. The regulator allows each outlet to be controlled independently, even though they are served by a common compressor and connected to the same system.

As with hose air lines, Fixed pipe air lines must be manufactured with anti-corrosion materials, such as non-ferrous metals or plastics, to prevent internal corrosion from air moisture content and condensate.

Commonly used materials for piped air line systems

- Aluminium – smooth bore, energy efficient pipework
- Galvanised carbon steel – medium and heavy weight pipework systems
- Stainless steel and copper compression jointed systems
- Plastics, ABS and MDPE pipework systems

Piped air lines are typically installed with a fall gradient away from the outlet point, this is to allow any build-up of moisture within the pipework (due to internal condensation) to drain via the automatic tank drain or via a drain leg installed on the system. Branch connections to serve outlets are typically taken vertically off the top of the main supply line and then loop down to the outlet point. This is done as a safety precaution and to avoid damaging pneumatic equipment. A connection into the top of a main air line greatly reduces the risk of Condensation water or particulates being discharged at high velocity through the outlet.

== Uses ==
Common uses of air hoses include:

- To supply compressed air to pneumatic hand tools.
- In road vehicles, between tractors and semi-trailers which use air brakes.
- In railway air brakes.
- To supply breathing gas to underwater divers from the surface, usually through a diving umbilical cable.
