= Euronet Worldwide =

Electronic payments company

Euronet Worldwide, Inc.
- Formerly: Euronet Holding; Euronet Services
- Type: Public
- Traded as: Nasdaq: EEFT; S&P 400 component
- Industry: Financial services; E-commerce payment systems
- Founded: June 22, 1994 in Budapest, Hungary
- Headquarters: Leawood, Kansas, U.S.
- Key people: Michael J. Brown (Chairman, CEO, and President); Kevin J. Caponecchi (Executive Vice President and CEO, epay, Software and EFT Asia Pacific Division); Adam Godderz; Juan C. Bianchi (Executive Vice President and CEO, Money Transfer Segment); Nikos Fountas (Executive Vice President and CEO, EFT Europe, Middle East and Africa Division); Martin L. Brückner; Tony Warren
- Revenue: ▲US$4,240 million (2025)
- Operating income: ▲US$550 million (2025)
- Net income: ▲US$309.5 million (2025)
- Total assets: ▲US$6,489 million (2025)
- Total equity: ▲US$1,323 million (2025)
- Number of employees: ▲10800 (2025)
- Divisions: epay; Ria Money Transfer; XE; EFT (Electronic Financial Transactions)
- Website: www.euronet.com

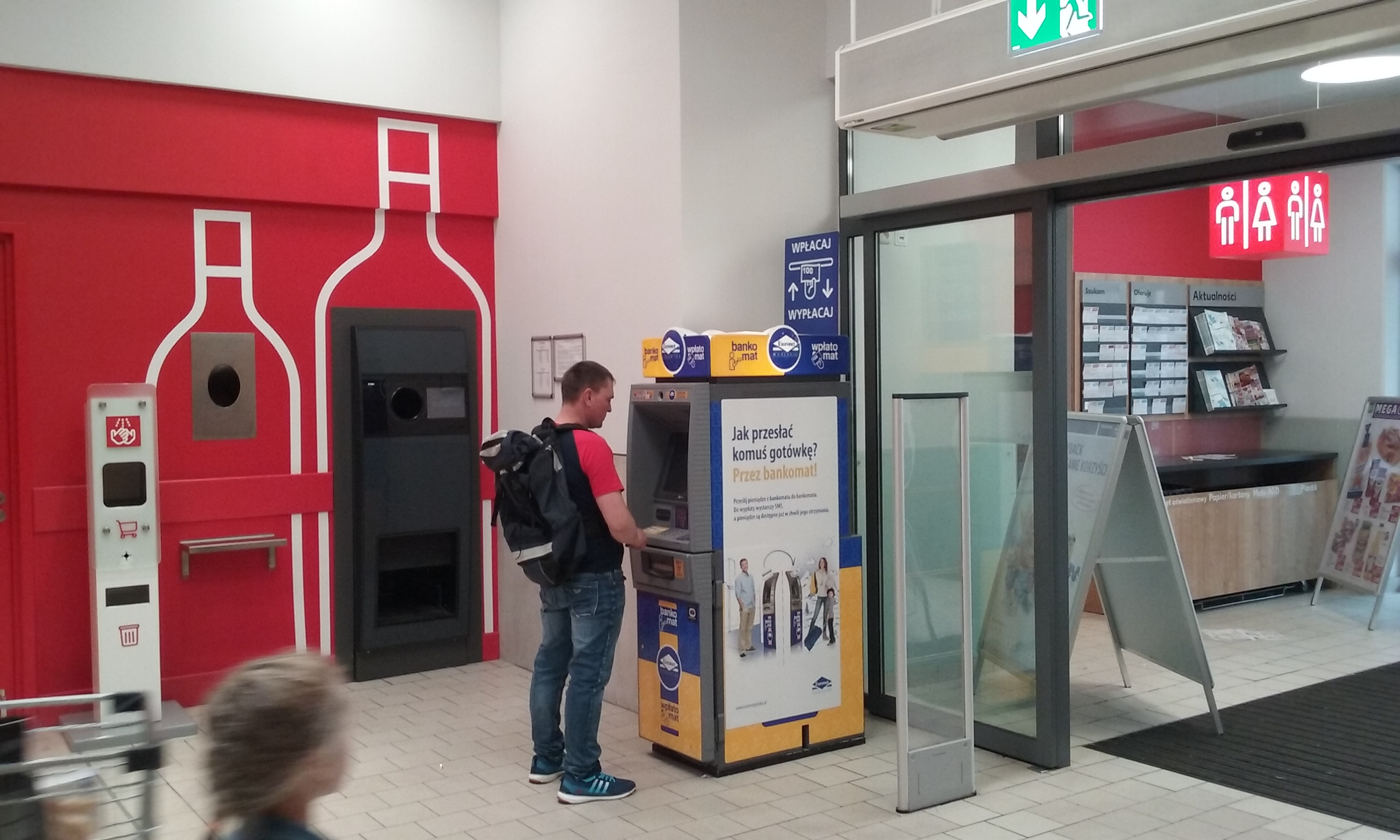
ATM (with cash deposit machine) Euronet in Tomaszów Mazowiecki, Poland

Euronet is an American provider of global electronic payment services with headquarters in Leawood, Kansas. It offers automated teller machines (ATM), point of sale (POS) services, credit/debit card services, currency exchange and other electronic financial services and payments software. Among others, it provides the prepaid subsidiaries Transact, PaySpot, epay, Movilcarga, TeleRecarga and ATX.

As of 2019, Euronet services 50,000 ATMs and 330,000 EFT point-of-sale terminals across 170 countries.

== History ==
The company was founded in 1994 by brothers-in-law Dan Henry and Mike Brown and headquartered in Budapest, Hungary. In 1998, Euronet purchased ARKSYS, a computer software company that specialized in electronic payment and transaction delivery systems. On January 23, 2002, Euronet Worldwide announced the formation of a joint venture with Hong Kong-based First Mobile Group Holdings Limited.

In April 2014, Walmart started offering a store-to-store money transfer service, partnering with Euronet's subsidiary Ria Money Transfer. Walmart2Walmart allows shoppers to transfer money to and from 4,000 Walmart stores in the U.S. In 2016, the program was expanded into the global money transfer service market with Walmart2World.

In June 2015, subsidiary Ria Money Transfer entered the Middle East remittance market with the buyout of money transfer provider, IME. In February 2020, Ria opened its first retail store in Singapore, allowing customers to transfer money at foreign exchange rates. In May 2020, Ria announced an expansion of their money transfer mobile app to European customers. In July 2020, OXXO, the largest chain of convenience stores in Latin America, partnered with Euronet’s Ria Money Transfer to begin offering money transferring services within their stores.

In December 2018, Euronet signed an agreement with Mozambique to provide software for the nation's financial system. Under the agreement, Euronet supports transaction processing services, connections to major card associations, ATM and Point of Sale device driving, card issuing, mobile recharge, bill payments, and digital wallets, among other services.

Euronet launched REN Foundation, a program that allows payment processors to add updated payment technology without having to replace existing hardware and software. The program allows banks and other payment service providers to adopt new technologies as they become available. The country of Mozambique switched its entire payment systems to run on Euronet’s REN Foundation program.

In January 2020, Euronet partnered with Standard Chartered to allow international ATM users to pay in their own currency rather than the local currency using a dynamic currency conversion (DCC) service. The ATM service will be provided in countries across Asia Pacific and the Middle East. That same month, Euronet began offering a recurring billing service to allow monthly payments for AppleCare products. Euronet also entered an agreement with AMBER Alert Europe in January 2020 to publish active missing child alerts on ATM screens. The next month, Euronet partnered with Amazon India to provide add-on payment services to Amazon’s mobile wallet platform.

In September 2020, Euronet's epay entered an agreement with Microsoft to manage monthly recurring billing for select retailers within the mobile gaming market.

In December 2020, Euronet purchased 700 non-branch ATMs from the Bank of Ireland.

=== Acquisitions ===
- e-pay, Ltd., February 2003, an electronic payments processor of prepaid mobile airtime top-up services in the U.K. and Australia. This added a prepaid processing division to Euronet that grew with the September 2003 purchase of Austin International Marketing and Investments, Inc. (AIM), a U.S. based company, and the acquisition of the German company transact Elektronische Zahlungssysteme GmbH in November 2003.
- Ria Money Transfer, 2007, a global money transfer company with a network of agents and company-owned stores in North America, the Caribbean, Europe and Asia. In June 2015, Ria entered the Middle East remittance market with the buyout of money transfer provider, IME.
- Pure Commerce, 2013, giving it access to a suite of SaaS based applications.
- HiFX, May 2014, a UK-based international payments provider giving it access to cross border payment business in the UK, Australia and New Zealand. This acquisition allowed Euronet to offer international payment services between accounts for high-income individuals and small-to-medium-sized businesses.
- xe.com, July 2015, a provider of digital foreign exchange rate information, bringing Euronet a large internet presence and users familiar with foreign currency.
- Innova, April 2018, which would allow Euronet to provide value-added tax refunds to its customers.
- Dolphin Debit, April 2020, a U.S. based ATM outsourcing company. Euronet operates ATM outsourcing services worldwide, but the 2020 acquisition allows the company to expand its outsourcing services to the U.S. for the first time.
- CoreCard, October 2025, an American payment processor that originally traded as a personal computer hardware manufacturer under the name Intelligent Systems.

== Controversies ==
In 2018, the Danish Consumer Council warned against using the ATMs due to high fees. "The fee is the same as if you withdraw in an ATM that is physically located abroad." Euronet states the fee is due to Danish banks not cooperating with Euronet to offer Dankort, the national debit card of Denmark, in the machine.

In January 2019, the municipality of Amsterdam announced its plans to prevent new Euronet ATMs from opening in shop facades, as Euronet "charges a hefty fee per cash withdrawal and uses unfavorable exchange rates."

The Czech Ministry of Finance drew attention of dynamic currency conversion to the European Union. The EU responded by adopting a new EU Regulation, according to which ATMs will have to show customers the exchange rate as well as the deviation from the exchange rate published by the European Central Bank. It entered into force in April 2020. Advocates for dynamic currency conversion argue that fees, in general, offer visibility of the total costs at the point of transaction.

In 2019, Euronet faced criticism from the city of Prague, where it had installed hundreds of ATMs, several of which have been illegally installed into the facades of historical buildings and heritage sites without permission, in some cases irreversibly damaging the buildings. One particular example is the Cubist Kiosk at Vrchlického sady, which has been judged by UNESCO to have been damaged beyond repair by the installation of a Euronet ATM.

== Company operation ==
It operates in three segments: electronic funds transfer (EFT) processing, prepaid processing, and money transfer.

- The EFT processing segment provides outsourcing and network services to financial institutions and mobile phone companies. This segment provided these services using a network of ATMs and POS terminals in Europe, Asia, and the Middle-East.
- The prepaid processing - ePay division distributes prepaid mobile airtime, and other prepaid products and collections services for various prepaid products, cards, and services. This segment operates in a network of locations in the United States, Europe, Africa, Asia Pacific, and the Middle-East. It also provides prepaid long-distance calling card plans, prepaid internet plans, prepaid debit cards, and prepaid gift cards, as well as prepaid mobile content, such as ring tones and games.
- The money transfer segment provides global money transfer and bill payment services primarily in North America, the Caribbean, Europe, and Asia-Pacific.

== See also ==
- ATM Industry Association (ATMIA)
