= CoreCard Corporation =

American technology company

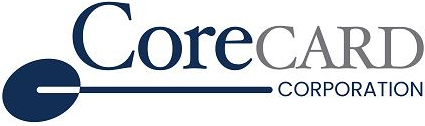
- Formerly: Intelligent Systems Corporation; Intelligent Systems Master Limited Partnership
- Type: Public
- Industry: Technology
- Founded: 1973; 53 years ago in Norcross, Georgia
- Founders: Terry Hughey; Charles Muench
- Products: Portable computers; Video terminals; Expansion cards; Peripherals
- Owner: Euronet Worldwide (2025-present)
- Divisions: Datavue Corporation; Quadram Corporation; Princeton Graphic Systems; Intecolor Corporation
- Website: corecard.com

CoreCard Corporation is an American financial technology company based in Norcross, Georgia. Before 2021, it was named Intelligent Systems Corporation and once sold portable computers, video terminals, expansion cards, and other peripherals through a variety of manufacturing subsidiaries.

Founded in 1973, the firm restructured as a master limited partnership in 1987, becoming Intelligent Systems Master Limited Partnership. In the 1990s, Intelligent Systems pivoted into providing venture capital for start-up technology firms, changing its name back to Intelligent Systems Corporation.

In 2021, the company changed its name to CoreCard Corporation, following another pivot to fintech. On October 30, 2025, Euronet Worldwide completed the purchase of the Georgia-based firm for approximately $260 million.

== Subsidiaries ==
Notable subsidiaries included:

- Datavue: it manufactures portable computers;
- Quadram: it manufactures expansion cards, mostly for the IBM PC, including memory and video cards (Quadram Quadcolor I & II);
- Princeton Graphic Systems: a maker of computer monitors;
- Intecolor: it took over the terminal manufacturing operations that were previously handled by Intelligent Systems; and more.

== History ==
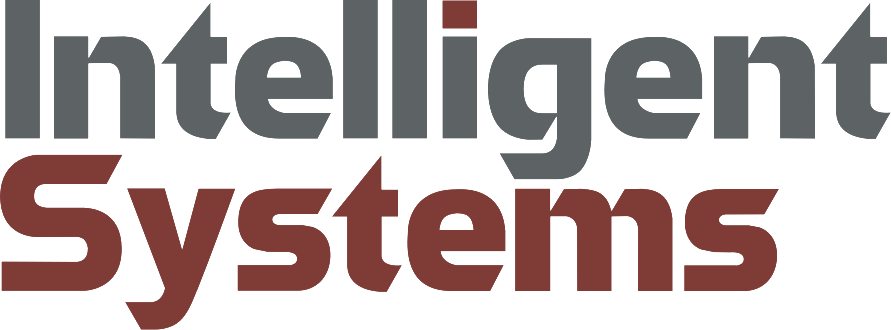
Former logo of Intelligent Systems Corporation

=== Intecolor and Compucolor (1973–1980) ===
Intelligent Systems Corporation was founded in 1973 by Terry Hughey and Charles Muench of Norcross, Georgia. Muench was an engineer who founded Integrated Systems, a company that manufactured remote alarm systems and control equipment for the electric power industry; Muench hired Hughey to be director of research and development at the company. After several profitable years, in 1972 Muench sold the company to the Esterline Corporation and took a brief sabbatical. In 1973, the two decided to found Intelligent Systems as their break into the video terminal industry, which had seen soaring profits in the early 1970s as time-shared mainframe computers became more accessible to businesses who needed number-crunching power. After three years of development, in February 1976 the company introduced the Intecolor 8001, a kit for a smart terminal powered by an Intel 8080 microprocessor and featuring 4 KB of RAM, driving the display capable of rendering 80 columns by 25 rows of text. In December 1976, the company sold the Compucolor 8001, an expanded kit of the Intecolor 8001 that turned it into a full-fledged microcomputer, adding 8 KB of RAM, a ROM with Microsoft BASIC, and a data tape reader that repurposed 8-track tapes commonly reserved for music. It was the first microcomputer kit with an integrated keyboard and monitor capable of color graphics output.

In October 1976, Muench laid off Hughey with severance so that the latter could pursue the high-end graphics market under his start-up, Chromatics Inc. Meanwhile Muench was busy leading a team behind a low-cost successor to the Compucolor 8001. Released as the CompuColor II in 1978, this incarnation of the computer replaced the wear-prone 8-track tapes with floppy diskettes, shrunk the monitor down to a 13-inch-diagonal unit, and completely eliminated the terminal-centric features. While he was able to drive to cost down to a certain point, for a unit with an adequate amount of RAM in 1978 it was still too costly for the average consumer and was pulled off the market in 1980. Intelligent Systems would then refocus on designing high-end terminals for the enterprise world. Intelligent Systems' terminal-manufacturing operations were later folded into Intecolor Corporation, an independently run subsidiary.

=== Growing empire (1983–1990) ===
Logo of Quadram Corporation post-acquisition

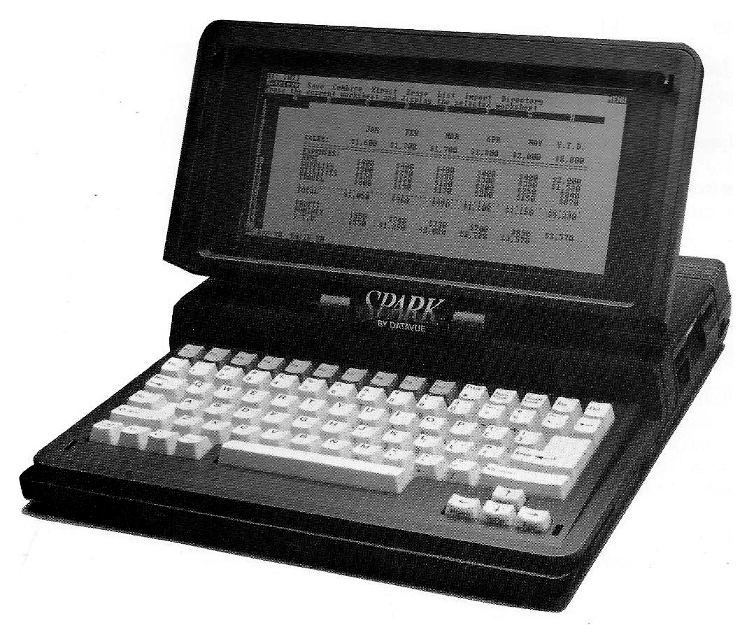
Spark, a laptop by Datavue Corporation released in 1986

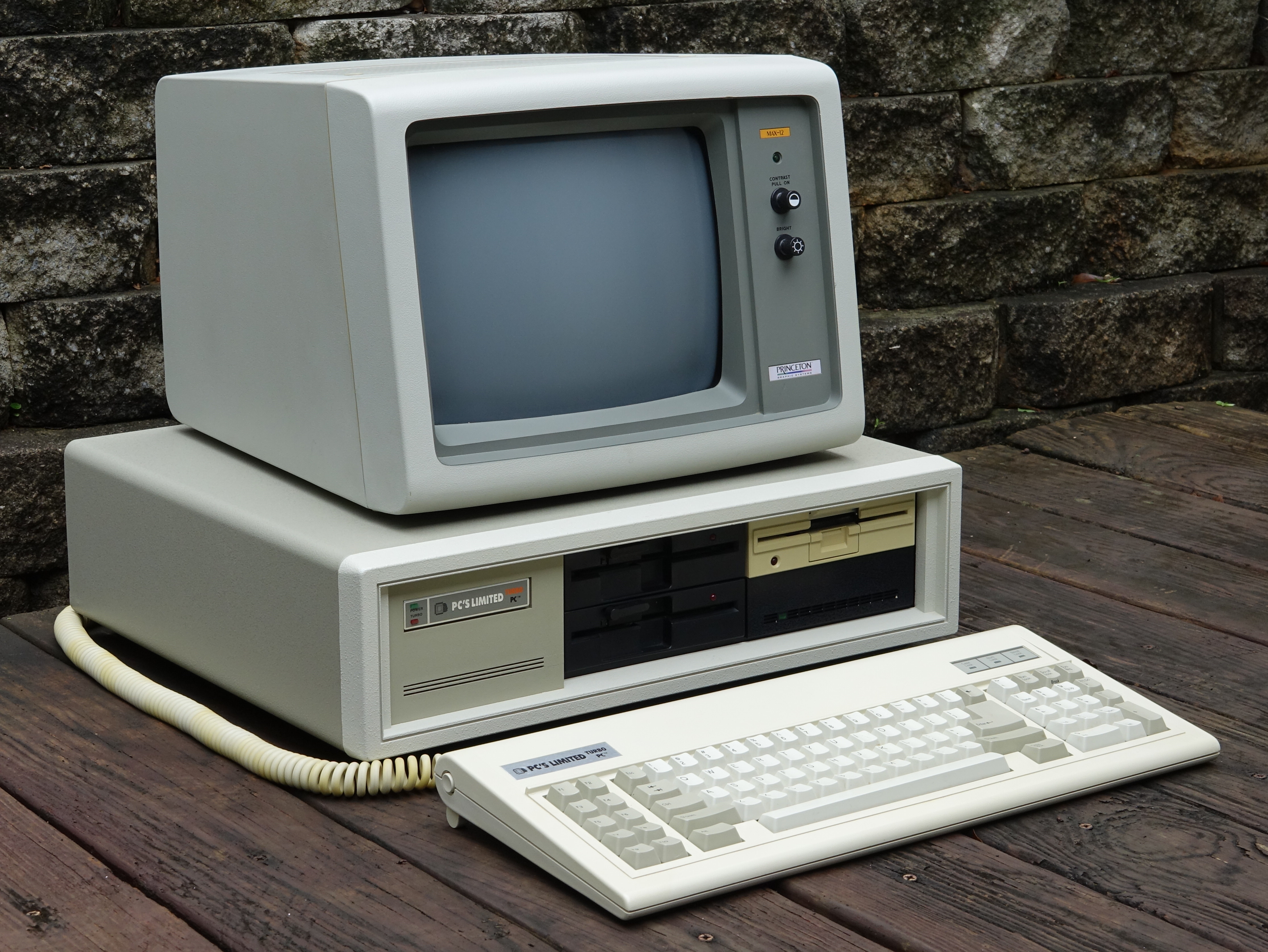
A Princeton Graphic Systems CGA monitor sitting on top of a PC's Limited Turbo PC (the first computer system from Dell)

In 1983, Intelligent Systems purchased Quadram Corporation, a start-up company that manufactured expansion cards for personal computers, for $35 million in stock. Quadram was founded by J. Leland Strange, who stayed with Intelligent Systems, eventually becoming its CEO in 1988. Shortly after the Quadram purchase, it bought out Datavue Corporation, an early designer of portable computers. Intelligent Systems posted $90 million in sales in 1983, and in 1984, the company opened up Prints and Graphics, their marque for printers. Quadram was one of the progenitors of the enhanced EMS standard for DOS memory management, collaborating with Ashton-Tate and AST Research to write the standard, which was published in 1985. By March 1986 Quadram had 20% of the multifunction card market. In December 1985, the Quadram division bought a stake in Video Seven, a computer graphics technology based in Milpitas, California. A joint venture between Quadram and Video Seven bore the Quad EGA+ and the Vega Card, sold under the Quadram and Video Seven brands respectively; they were both EGA-compatible graphics cards that improved upon standard in a number of ways.

In May 1985, Management Science America sold their Peachtree Software division to Intelligent Systems for an undisclosed sum, reportedly $1 million. Peachtree had developed and sold a popular line of accounting software for home and personal computer users, but was losing money.

On the downslope of its share price peak in 1986, in October that year Intelligent Systems announced the divestiture of many or all of its divisions. In early 1987, the company's board members restructured Intelligent Systems into a master limited partnership, rechristening the company as Intelligent Systems Master Limited Partnership. In September 1987, the company announced it had fully reversed its stance on selling off units of the company, although in August 1988 Intelligent Systems sold Peachtree Software to the subsidiary's management for $20 million in cash. Nearly a year later, Intelligent Systems agreed to sell the Quadram name and consumer-oriented PC expansions and peripherals to National Semiconductor. The rest of Quadram's assets—comprising an accelerator board known as the Quad386XT, a Token Ring network card, and line of memory expansion boards for the PS/2 known as PS/Q—were then folded into Q/Cor, a marketing arm under Intelligent Systems. Although Quadram was perhaps Intelligent Systems' best-known division and brought in $50 million in sales in 1986, according to InfoWorld the division barely broke even or had been losing money for Intelligent Systems, compared to the thicker margins posted by the $20 million and $50 million respective sales of Princeton Graphics and Intecolor that year.

=== Post-divestiture and pivots (1990–present) ===
Princeton Graphic Systems was purchased by World Wide Technology in January 1989, the brand surviving into the next millennium. Datavue meanwhile was sold to a private company, and Intecolor like Peachtree was purchased by its management with help from Muench, after which the company reverted to being privately owned and operated. Intelligent Systems pivoted into providing venture capital for start-up technology firms in the 1990s, eventually changing its name back to Intelligent Systems Corporation during the decade. After pivoting again to the fintech industry in the mid-2010s, Intelligent Systems changed its name to CoreCard Corporation in 2021, assuming the name of its fintech software subsidiary founded in 2001.
