= SMC Corporation =

Japanese control systems and equipment manufacturer

- Type: Public (K.K)
- Traded as: TYO: 6273; TOPIX 100 Component
- Industry: Machinery
- Founded: Tokyo (April 27, 1959; 67 years ago)
- Headquarters: Sotokanda, Chiyoda-ku, Tokyo 101-0021, Japan
- Number of locations: Factories in 28 countries Subsidiaries in 50 countries Sales offices in 82 countries
- Key people: Yoshiki Takada; Representative Director and Vice President Yoshiyuki Takada (1928-2024); Founder Katsunori Maruyama (President)
- Products: Automatic control equipment; Sintered filters; Filtration equipment
- Revenue: ▲JP¥ 458 billion (FY 2014) (US$ 3.82 billion) (FY 2014)
- Net income: ▲JP¥ 109.5 billion (FY 2014) (US$ 913 million) (FY 2014)
- Number of employees: 20,853 (2020)
- Website: Official website

SMC Corporation (SMC 株式会社, SMC Kabushiki-gaisha) is a Japanese TOPIX Large 70 company founded in 1959 as Sintered Metal Corporation, which specializes in pneumatic control engineering to support industrial automation. SMC develops a broad range of control systems and equipment, such as directional control valves, actuators, and air line equipment, to support diverse applications. SMC's head office is located in Sotokanda, Chiyoda-ku, Tokyo, Japan. The company has a global engineering network, with technical facilities in the United States, Europe, and China, as well as Japan. Key production facilities are located in China and Singapore, and local production facilities are in United States, Mexico, Brazil, Europe, India, South Korea, and Australia.

== Market regions ==
SMC has 400 marketing and sales offices in 81 countries worldwide.

1. North, Central and South America

Argentina, Bolivia, Brasil, Canada, Chile, Colombia, Ecuador, Mexico, Peru, United States, Venezuela, Costa Rica.

2. Europe

Albania, Austria, Belgium, Bosnia/Herzegovina, Bulgaria, Croatia, Czech Republic, Denmark, Estonia, Finland, France, Germany, Greece, Hungary, Ireland, Italy, Kazakhstan, Latvia, Lithuania, Macedonia, Netherlands, Norway, Poland, Portugal, Romania, Russia, Serbia, Slovakia, Slovenia, Spain, Sweden, Switzerland, Turkey, U.K., Ukraine

3. Africa

Algeria, Egypt, Kenya, Morocco, Nigeria, South Africa, Tunisia

4. Asia/Oceania

Australia, Bahrain, Bangladesh, China, Hong Kong, India, Indonesia, Iran, Israel, Japan, Jordan, Kuwait, Malaysia, New Zealand, Pakistan, Philippines, Qatar, Saudi Arabia, Singapore, South Korea, Sri Lanka, Syria, Taiwan, Thailand, United Arab Emirates, Viet Nam
