= Ria Money Transfer =

American money transfer company

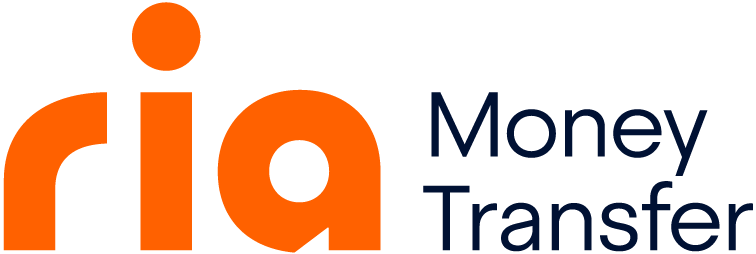
- Type: Subsidiary
- Industry: Financial services Electronic funds transfer
- Founded: 1987; 39 years ago
- Headquarters: Buena Park, California, United States
- Key people: Juan Bianchi, CEO, Euronet’s Money Transfer Segment
- Products: Remittance
- Revenue: $1.18 billion (2020)
- Operating income: $59.7 million (2020)
- Number of employees: 4000+ (approx.) (2021)
- Parent: Euronet Worldwide
- Website: riamoneytransfer.com

Ria Money Transfer (Ria) is an American financial services company which specializes in customer-to-customer international money transfers. It is a subsidiary of Euronet Worldwide, Inc. (NASDAQ: EEFT) and operates as part of its Cross-Border payments segment.

== History ==
Ria was founded in New York in 1987. In 2006, Ria was acquired by Euronet Worldwide, Inc., becoming part of its Cross-Border Payments segment together with Xe and Dandelion Payments.

Ria maintains partnerships with a number of postal organizations around the world, leveraging their extensive retail networks to expand access to financial services, including India Post Payments Bank (IPPB) in India, Bpost in Belgium, and Pos Indonesia.

In 2014, the company launched Walmart-2-Walmart Powered by Ria, a Walmart money transfer service within the US. Then in 2019, Ria and Walmart partnered with PayPal's Xoom to introduce domestic money transfer services. Xoom expanded to 60 countries in the deal with Ria.

In 2015, Ria acquired Malaysia-based money transfer provider IME. This was just the beginning of Ria’s expansion in the region. In the Philippines, Ria partner with GCash in 2025 allowing Filipinos in the U.S., Europe, Australia and Singapore to send money to their loved ones. Ria also partnered with the Palawan Group of Companies offering remittance senders the option to send funds via the PalawaPay e-wallet. In Japan, Ria announced the acquisition of a 60% majority stake in Unidos Co., Ltd., a Japan-based funds transfer company operating under the brand name Kyodai Remittance. The transaction marked a strategic expansion of Ria’s presence in the Asia-Pacific region, particularly in Japan’s growing remittance market.

In 2024, Ria became the exclusive money-transfer provider for Chicago-based PLS Financial Services Inc.

Ria and Xe joined forces in 2024 collaborating with Google to make it easier for users to find and conduct cross-border payments via Ria’ and Xe’s services through a digital marketplace.

As of December 31, 2025, Ria has a global network of more than 639,000 locations.

== Products and services ==
Though money transfers is Ria’s core business, it also offers customers bill payments services, money orders, comprehensive check cashing, foreign currency exchange and mobile top-ups through the following channels: agent locations, company-owned stores, mobile apps, TeleRia phone and on internet enabled devices at riamoneytransfer.com.

In 2025, Ria launched its eWallet in Malaysia, expanding its digital financial services in Southeast Asia. The eWallet enables users to deposit funds, withdraw cash from ATMs, and send and receive money without requiring a traditional bank account. The initiative aims to support financial inclusion, particularly among unbanked populations such as migrant workers, by providing accessible and secure financial tools to help meet everyday needs.

== Sponsorships ==
Ria partnered with Atlético de Madrid from 2019 until 2024. This partnership amplified Ria’s visibility through match day activations and fan engagement initiatives, while reflecting on shared values of connection, resilience and passion.

Ria became FC Internazionale Milano’s (Inter) Official Money Transfer Partner in 2023. Extending the collaboration through the 2026/2027 season, the partnership includes support for initiatives such as Inter Academy Chile, a football school for boys and girls from the ages of 4-14 years, highlighting a shared commitment to community development and opportunity through sports.

Ria extended its presence in global sports serving as title sponsor of the 2025 Caribbean Series (Serie del Caribe) in Mexicali. The tournament is one of the most prominent events in Latin American baseball.

That same year, Ria became the official remittance services partner of the Mexican Football Federation, supporting both the men’s and women’s national teams through a multi-year agreement as sponsors in the United States.

== Awards and Recognitions ==
Accredited since 2015, Ria has received an A+ rating from the Better Business Bureau (BBB), reflecting the organization’s assessment of the company’s commitment to resolving customer complaints, maintaining transparent business practices, and operating with integrity.

Ria has been recognized as one of the best companies for young professionals in El Salvador by the 2024 Employers for Youth (EFY) study conducted by human resource specialists FirstJob, the survey took into consideration a broad range of factors, including career development prospects as well as the day-to-day workplace experience.

In August 2025, Ria Money Transfer received a recognition from the Government of Querétaro, Mexico, for exceeding its employment growth commitments in the state. The award, presented by the Ministry of Sustainable Development (SEDESU), acknowledged Ria's contribution to local economic development and job creation, with the company employing more than 500 people in Querétaro.

In 2025, Ria received international recognition for its brand storytelling, earning two awards at the Cannes Corporate Media & TV Awards for its documentary Good Teacher. The firm received a Gold Award in the Corporate Responsibility Category and was the sole recipient of the Best Emotional Appeal Award. In 2026, the documentary was also recognized with a Silver Tower by the New York Festivals TV & Film Awards.

== Philanthropy ==
Ria has collaborated with Children’s Rehabilitation Institution TeletonUSA (CRIT) and Teleton El Salvador supporting fundraising campaigns through its global network and participating in televised telethon events aimed at raising funds for children with disabilities.

In 2022, the company announced a global partnership with Save the Children, an international non-governmental organization, aimed at supporting programs that improve the well-being of vulnerable children worldwide. Through this partnership, Ria has supported initiatives designed to expand the access to quality early-childhood education for children in Mexico and the Philippines.
