= Bouhalouane train crash =

1982 railway incident in Algeria

Details
- Date: January 27, 1982; 1:30 a.m.
- Location: Bouhalouane, Chlef Province
- Country: Algeria
- Line: Oran to Algiers
- Incident type: Rear collision
- Cause: brake failure

Statistics
- Trains: 2
- Deaths: 131
- Injured: 200

The Bouhalouane train crash was a fatal railway accident that happened at Bouhalouane in Algeria on January 27, 1982 at 01:30 and killed 131 people.

A passenger train travelling from Oran to the capital Algiers and consisting of a locomotive and eight carriages stalled on a steep gradient leading to a mountain pass a few kilometres beyond the town of Bouhalouane in the Chlef Province of Algeria. The locomotive was uncoupled leaving the carriages unsecured; the brakes failed on the carriages and they rolled back down the slope to Bouhalouane where they collided with a freight train in the station. The noise woke many of the residents who rushed to the station where they witnessed an 'apocalyptic scene'. The passenger carriages were split open and stacked upon each other; screams of the wounded could be heard. Motorists passing the station were stopped and their cars became makeshift ambulances taking the injured to nearby hospitals. Heavy lifting equipment and cutting torches were used as police and army worked to rescue the injured, illuminated by spotlights. By dawn 100 bodies had been recovered. The final death toll was 131 people, with 200 injured, resulting as Algeria's deadliest rail disaster.

== Similar accidents ==
- Round Oak rail accident - (14 Killed) - 23 August 1858 – Excursion runaway; brake not applied
- Abergele rail disaster – (33 Killed) - 26 August 1868 – Brake broken by rough shunting
- Stairfoot rail accident - 12 September 1870 - Poorly secured wagons runaway due to rough shunting. (see also BoT accident report)
- Armagh rail disaster - (80 killed) - 12 June 1889 - Excursion runaway; brake not applied
- Murulla railway accident (26 killed) - 13 September 1926 - air brake failure
- 13 die near Kisumu, Kenya, after a passenger train rolls back because of air brake failure - 15 August 2000
- Tenga rail disaster - 25 May 2002
- Igandu train disaster - 24 June 2002

== Sources ==
- Derail: Why Trains Crash by Nicholas Faith, page 49, publ 2000 by Channel 4 books, ISBN 0-7522-7165-2
- 44 A BC SUCESOS VIERNES 29- 1- 82 (in Spanish)
