= Railway brake =

Component of railway rolling stock

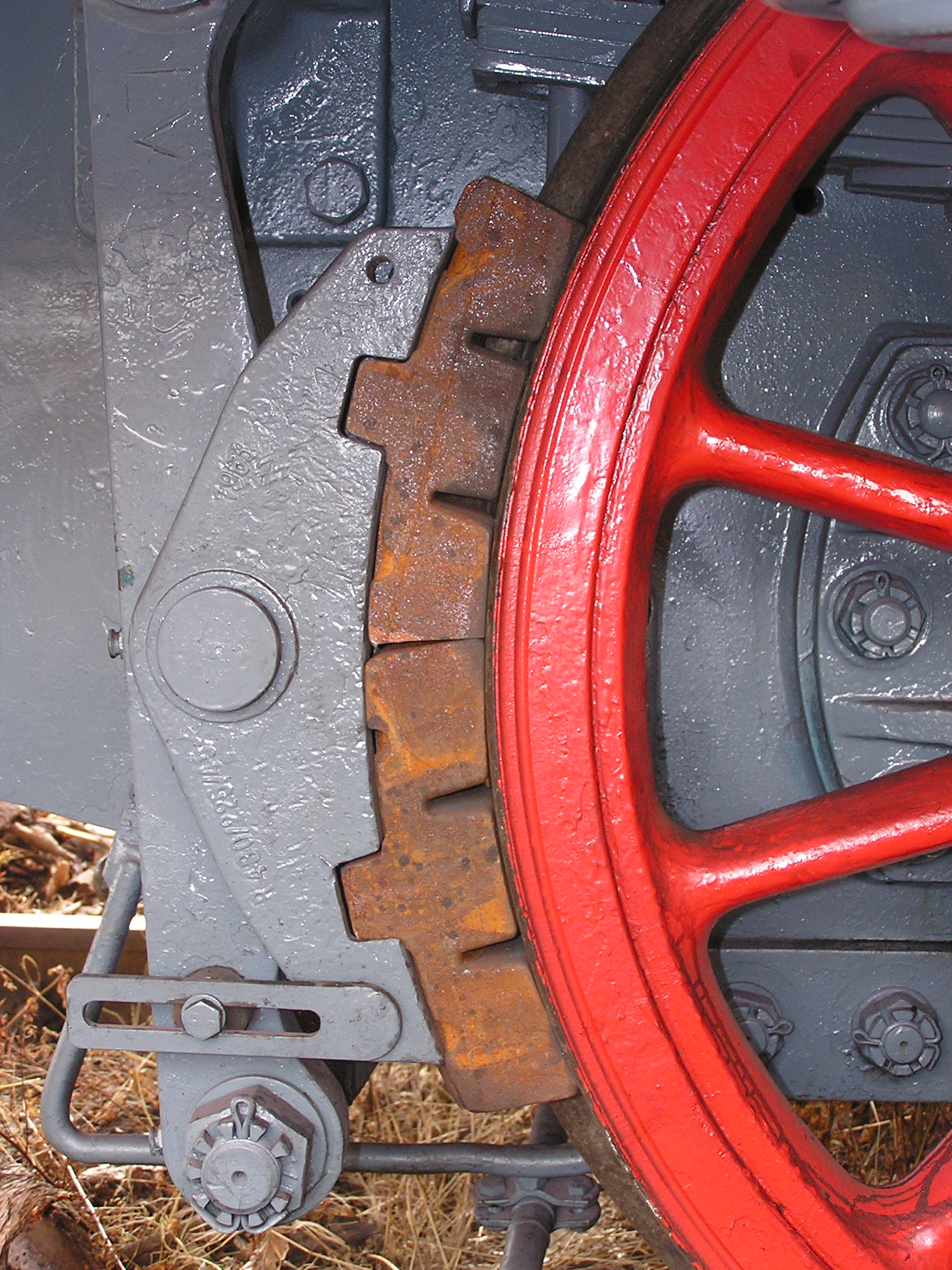
A traditional clasp brake: the cast iron brake shoe (brown) is pushed against the running surface (tyre) of the wheel (red), and is operated by the levers (grey) on the left.

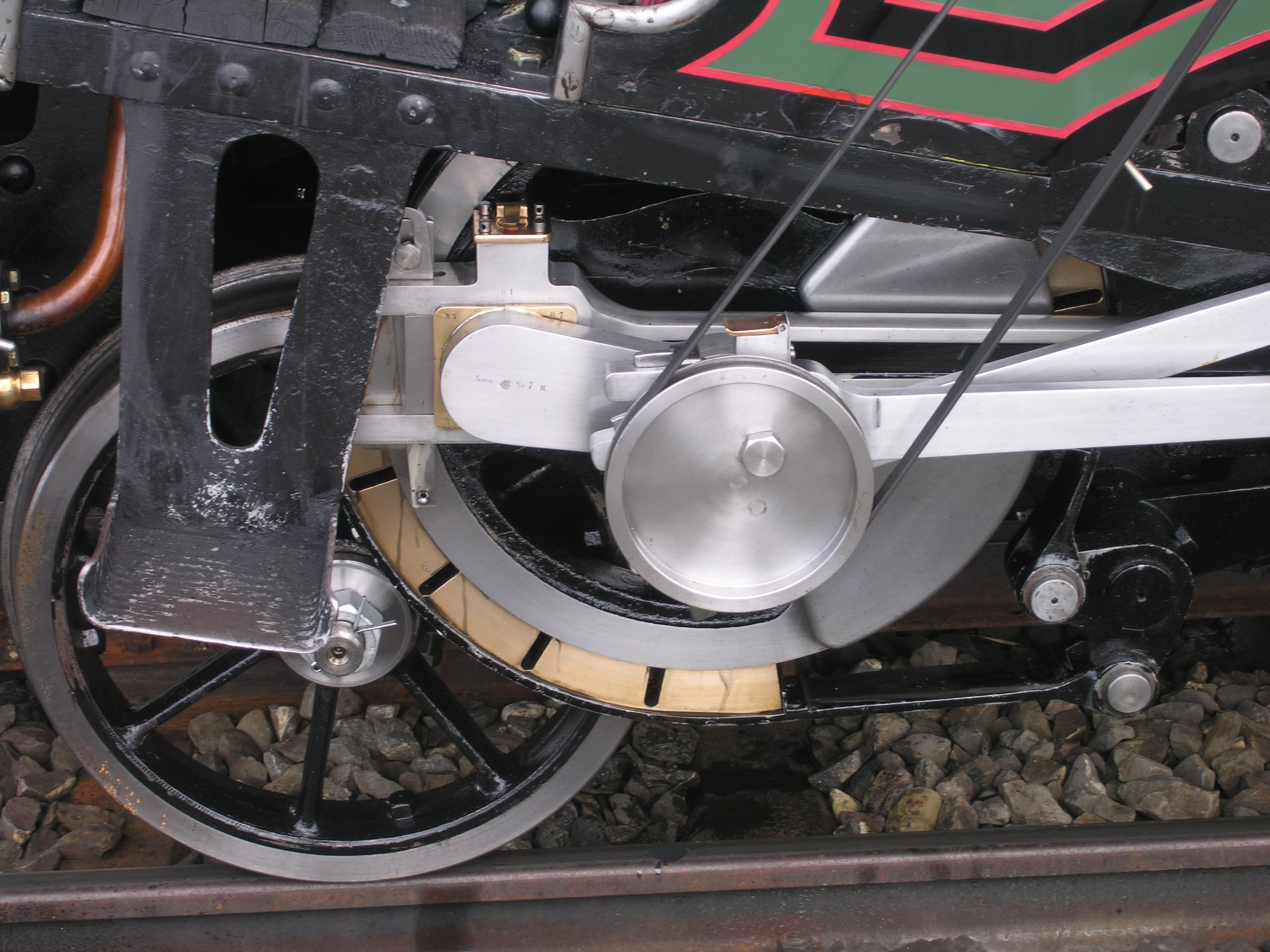
A band brake fitted to an 1873 steam locomotive of the Rigi Railways

A railway brake is a type of brake used on the cars of railway trains to enable deceleration, control acceleration (downhill) or to keep them immobile when parked. While the basic principle is similar to that on road vehicle usage, operational features are more complex because of the need to control multiple linked carriages and to be effective on vehicles left without a prime mover. Clasp brakes are one type of brakes historically used on trains.

== Early developments ==
In the earliest days of railways, braking technology was primitive. The first trains had brakes operative on the locomotive tender and on vehicles in the train, where "porters" or, in the United States brakemen, operated the brakes, traveling on the vehicle for that purpose. Some railways fitted a special deep-noted brake whistle to locomotives to indicate to the porters the necessity to apply the brakes. All the brakes at this stage of development were applied by operation of a screw and linkage to brake blocks applied to wheel treads, and these brakes could be used when vehicles were parked. In the earliest times, the porters travelled in crude shelters outside the vehicles, but "assistant guards" who travelled inside passenger vehicles, and who had access to a brake wheel at their posts, supplanted them. The braking effort achievable was limited and it was also unreliable, as the application of brakes by guards depended upon their hearing and responding quickly to a whistle for brakes.

An early development was the application of a steam brake to locomotives, where boiler pressure could be applied to brake blocks on the locomotive wheels. As train speeds increased, it became essential to provide some more powerful braking system capable of instant application and release by the train operator, described as a continuous brake because it would be effective continuously along the length of the train.

In the United Kingdom, the Abbots Ripton rail accident in January 1876 was aggravated by the long stopping distances of express trains without continuous brakes, which – it became clear – in adverse conditions could considerably exceed those assumed when positioning signals. This had become apparent from the trials on railway brakes carried out at Newark in the previous year, to assist a Royal Commission then considering railway accidents. In the words of a contemporary railway official, these

showed that under normal conditions it required a distance of 800 to 1200 yards to bring a train to rest when travelling at 45½ to 48½ mph, this being much below the ordinary travelling speed of the fastest express trains. Railway officials were not prepared for this result and the necessity for a great deal more brake power was at once admitted

Trials conducted after Abbots Ripton reported the following for an express train roughly matching conditions involved (such as a 1 in 200 downward run, but not braking under favorable conditions):

Braking system	Train speed		Distance		Stopping time (s)
Braking system	mph	km/h	yd	m	Stopping time (s)
Continuous (vacuum)	45	72	410	370	26
Continuous (vacuum)	45	72	451	412	30
3 brake vans	40.9	65.8	800	730	59
2 brake vans	40.9	65.8	631	577	44
2 brake vans	45	72	795	727	55
1 brake van	45	72	1,125	1,029	70

However, there was no clear technical solution to the problem, because of the necessity of achieving a reasonably uniform rate of braking effort throughout a train, and because of the necessity to add and remove vehicles from the train at frequent points on the journey. (At these dates, unit trains were a rarity).

The chief types of solution were:

- A spring system: James Newall, carriage builder to the Lancashire and Yorkshire Railway, in 1853 obtained a patent for a system whereby a rotating rod passing the length of the train was used to wind up the brake levers on each carriage against the force of conical springs carried in cylinders. The rod, mounted on the carriage roofs in rubber journals, was fitted with universal joints and short sliding sections to allow for compression of the buffers. The brakes were controlled from one end of the train. To release the brakes the guard wound up the rod to compress the springs, whereupon they were held off by a single ratchet under his control (although in an emergency the driver could draw on a cord to release the ratchet). When the ratchet was released the springs applied the brakes. If the train divided, the brakes were not held off by the ratchet in the guard's compartment and the springs in each carriage forced the brakes onto the wheels. Excess play in the couplings limited the effectiveness of the device to about five carriages; additional guards and brake compartments were necessary if this number were exceeded. This apparatus was sold to a few companies and the system received recommendation from the Board of Trade. The L&Y conducted a simultaneous trial with a similar system designed by another employee, Charles Fay, but little difference was found in their effectiveness. In Fay's version, patented in 1856, the rods passed beneath the carriages and the direct spring application to each brake was given an intervening worm drive. The important "automatic" feature of Newall's system was retained but the worm drive ensured that the brakes did not act too fiercely when released. It was Fay's version of the system that the company entered for the Newark brake trials of June 1875, where a moderate performance, usually in the mid position of the eight systems on test, was achieved.
- The chain brake, in which a chain was connected continuously along the bottom of the train. When pulled tight, it activated a friction clutch that used the rotation of the wheels to tighten a brake system at that point; this system has severe limitations in length of train capable of being handled (as braking strength was considerably weaker after the third car), and of achieving good adjustment (give the slack that pin couplers required, which a fixed-length chain could not account for). In the United States, the chain brake was independently developed and patented by Lucious Stebbins of Hartford, Connecticut in 1848 and by William Loughridge of Weverton, Maryland in 1855. The British version was known as the Clark and Webb Brake, after John Clark, who developed it throughout the 1840s, and Francis William Webb, who perfected it in 1875. The chain brake remained in use until the 1870s in America and 1890s in the UK.
  - The Heberlein brake is a notable variation on the chain brake popular in Germany, using an overhead cable instead of an underlinked chain.
- Hydraulic brakes. Actuating pressure to apply brakes was transmitted hydraulically (as with automobile brakes). These found some favour in the UK (e.g. with the Midland and Great Eastern Railways), but water was used as the hydraulic fluid and even in the UK "Freezing possibilities told against the hydraulic brakes, though the Great Eastern Railway, which used them for a while, overcame this by the use of salt water"

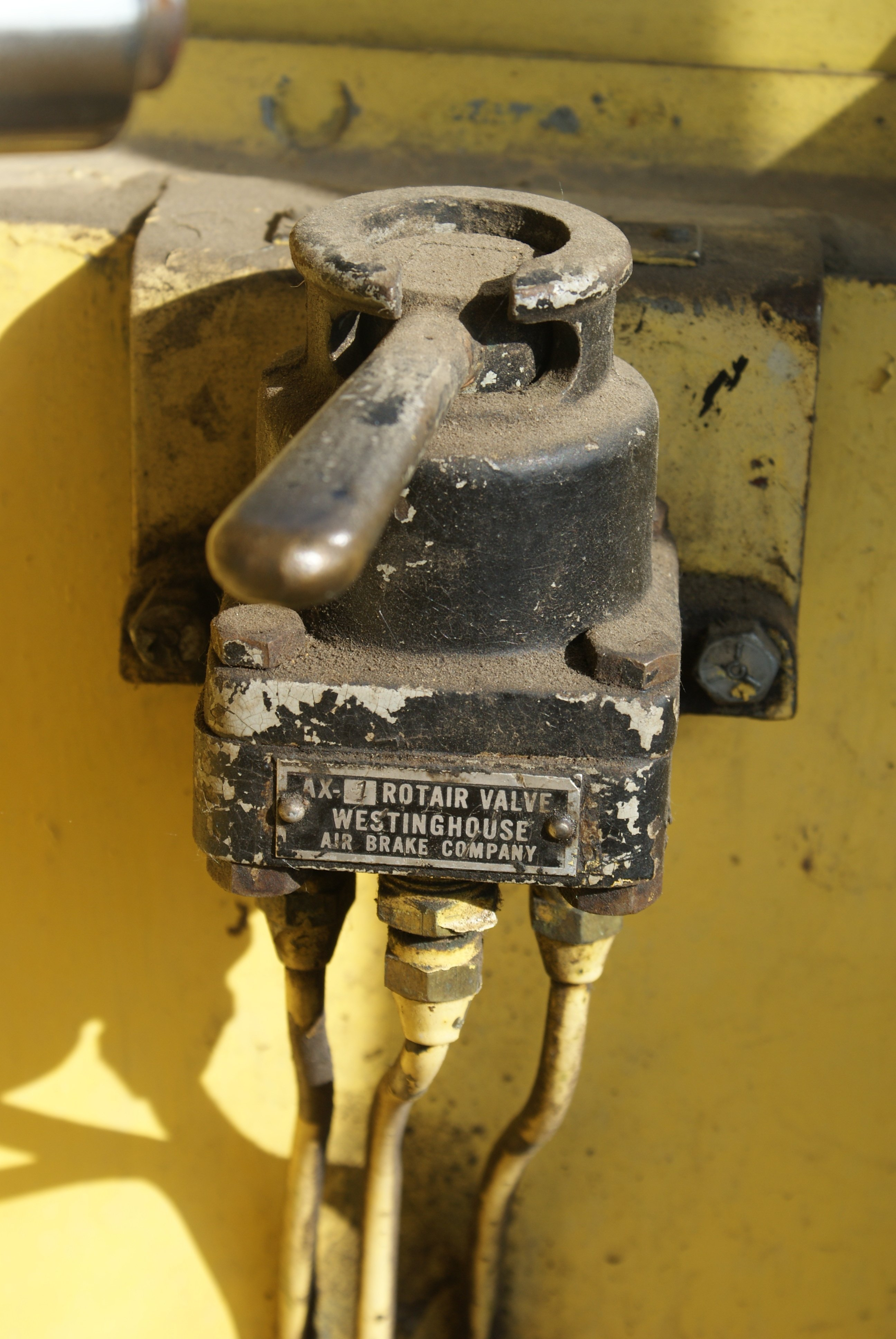
Controller valve from Rotair Valve Westinghouse Air Brake Company

- The simple vacuum system. An ejector on the locomotive created a vacuum in a continuous pipe along the train, allowing the external air pressure to operate brake cylinders on every vehicle. This system was very cheap and effective, but it had the major weakness that it became inoperative if the train became divided or if the train pipe was ruptured.
- The automatic vacuum brake. This system was similar to the simple vacuum system, except that the creation of vacuum in the train pipe exhausted vacuum reservoirs on every vehicle and released the brakes. If the driver applied the brake, his driver's brake valve admitted atmospheric air to the train pipe, and this atmospheric pressure applied the brakes against the vacuum in the vacuum reservoirs. Being an automatic brake, this system applies braking effort if the train becomes divided or if the train pipe is ruptured. Its disadvantage is that the large vacuum reservoirs were required on every vehicle, and their bulk and the rather complex mechanisms were seen as objectionable.
- The Westinghouse air brake system. In this system, air reservoirs are provided on every vehicle and the locomotive charges the train pipe with a positive air pressure, which releases the vehicle brakes and charges the air reservoirs on the vehicles. If the driver applies the brakes, his brake valve releases air from the train pipe, and triple valves at each vehicle detect the pressure loss and admit air from the air reservoirs to brake cylinders, applying the brakes. The Westinghouse system uses smaller air reservoirs and brake cylinders than the corresponding vacuum equipment, because a moderately high air pressure can be used. However, an air compressor is required to generate the compressed air and in the earlier days of railways, this required a large reciprocating steam air compressor, and this was regarded by many engineers as highly undesirable. A further drawback was the need to release the brake completely before it could be re-applied—initially there was no "graduable release" available and numerous accidents occurred while the brake power was temporarily unavailable.

Note: there are a number of variants and developments of all these systems.

The Newark trials showed the braking performance of the Westinghouse air-brakes to be distinctly superior: but for other reasons it was the vacuum system that was generally adopted on UK railways.

Braking system	Train weight with engine		Train speed		Stopping distance		Time to stop (s)	Deceleration		Rails
Braking system	long tons	tonnes	mph	km/h	yd	m	Time to stop (s)	g	m/s^{2}	Rails
Westinghouse automatic	203 ton 4 cwt	206.5	52	84	304	278	19	0.099	0.97	dry
Clark hydraulic	198 ton 3 cwt	201.3	52	84	404	369	22.75	0.075	0.74	dry
Smith vacuum	262 ton 7 cwt	266.6	49.5	79.7	483	442	29	0.057	0.56	dry
Clark and Webb chain	241 ton 10 cwt	245.4	47.5	76.4	479	438	29	0.056	0.55	dry
Barker's hydraulic	210 ton 2 cwt	213.5	50.75	81.67	516	472	32	0.056	0.55	dry
Westinghouse vacuum	204 ton 3 cwt	207.4	52	84	576	527	34.5	0.052	0.51	wet
Fay mechanical	186 ton 3 cwt	189.1	44.5	71.6	388	355	27.5	0.057	0.56	wet
Steel & McInnes air	197 ton 7 cwt	200.5	49.5	79.7	534	488	34.5	0.051	0.50	wet

=== Later British practice ===
In British practice, only passenger trains were fitted with continuous brakes until about 1930; goods and mineral trains ran at slower speed and relied on the brake force from the locomotive and tender and the brake van—a heavy vehicle provided at the rear of the train and occupied by a guard.

Goods and mineral vehicles had hand brakes which were applied by a hand lever operated by staff on the ground. These hand brakes were used where necessary when vehicles were parked but also when trains were descending a steep gradient. The train stopped at the top of the gradient, and the guard walked forward to "pin down" the handles of the brakes, so the brakes were partially applied during the descent. Early goods vehicles had brake handles on one side only, but from about 1930 brake handles were required on both sides of good vehicles. Trains containing hand-braked vehicles were described as "unfitted": they were in use in Britain until about 1985. From about 1930, semi-fitted trains were introduced, in which goods vehicles fitted with continuous brakes were marshalled next to the locomotive, giving sufficient braking power to run at higher speeds than unfitted trains. A trial in January 1952 saw a 52-wagon, 850 ton coal train run 127 miles (204 km) at an average of 38 miles per hour (61 km/h), compared to the usual maximum speed on the Midland main line of 25 miles per hour (40 km/h) for unfitted freight trains. In 1952, 14% of open wagons, 55% of covered wagons and 80% of cattle trucks had vacuum brakes.

In the early days of diesel locomotives, a purpose-built brake tender was attached to the locomotive to increase braking effort when hauling unfitted trains. The brake tender was low, so that the driver could still see the line and signals ahead if the brake tender was propelled (pushed) ahead of the locomotive, which was often the case.

By 1878 there were over 105 patents in various countries for braking systems, most of which were not widely adopted.

== Continuous brakes ==
As train loads, gradients and speeds increased, braking became a more significant problem. In the late 19th century, significantly better continuous brakes started to appear. The earliest type of continuous brake was the chain brake which used a chain, running the length of the train, to operate brakes on all vehicles simultaneously.

The chain brake was soon superseded by air-operated or vacuum operated brakes. These brakes used hoses connecting all the wagons of a train, so the operator could apply or release the brakes with a single valve in the locomotive.

These continuous brakes can be simple or automatic, the essential difference being what happens should the train break in two. With simple brakes, pressure is needed to apply the brakes, and all braking power is lost if the continuous hose is broken for any reason. Simple non-automatic brakes are thus useless when things really go wrong, as is shown with the Armagh rail disaster.

Automatic brakes on the other hand use the air or vacuum pressure to hold the brakes off against a reservoir carried on each vehicle, which applies the brakes if pressure/vacuum is lost in the train pipe. Automatic brakes are thus largely "fail safe", though faulty closure of hose taps can lead to accidents such as the Gare de Lyon accident.

The standard Westinghouse Air Brake has the additional enhancement of a triple valve and a local reservoir on each wagon, enabling the brakes to be applied fully with only a slight reduction in air pressure, reducing the time that it takes to release the brakes as not all pressure is voided to the atmosphere.

Non-automatic brakes still have a role on engines and first few wagons, as they can be used to control the whole train without having to apply the automatic brakes.

== Types ==
This is not a complete list of all railway brakes, but lists most of the common examples.

=== Mechanical brake ===
Most tractive units, passenger coaches and some freight wagons are equipped with a hand-operated parking brake (handbrake). This acts directly (mechanically) on the vehicle's brake linkage. The activation of such a brake prevents wheel rotation independently of the pneumatic brake and is therefore suitable for securing parked wagons and coaches from unintentional movement. Only mechanical brakes can be used for this purpose, since the holding power of air brakes cannot be maintained indefinitely without a working compressor.

There are two types. The handbrake that can be operated on board the vehicle is used firstly to prevent it from rolling away and secondly to regulate the speed for certain shunting operations and to stop trains if the automatic brake fails. It is usually designed as a screw brake and is operated from a brakeman's platform or, in the case of passenger coaches, from inside the coach, usually from an entrance area. On UIC freight wagons, this braking weight is framed in white (white like the rest of the brake inscription, alternatively black on a white or light-coloured background). Hand brakes on tenders and tank locomotives are often designed as counterweight brakes.

A manually operating parking brake is only suitable for securing static railway vehicles from rolling away. It can be designed as a hand wheel or as a spring-loaded brake.

A direction-dependent pawl brake is often installed in vehicles on rack railways. It only brakes when going downhill. When driving uphill, the applied ratchet brake is released by a ratchet mechanism and prevents the train from rolling backwards.

=== Air and vacuum brakes ===
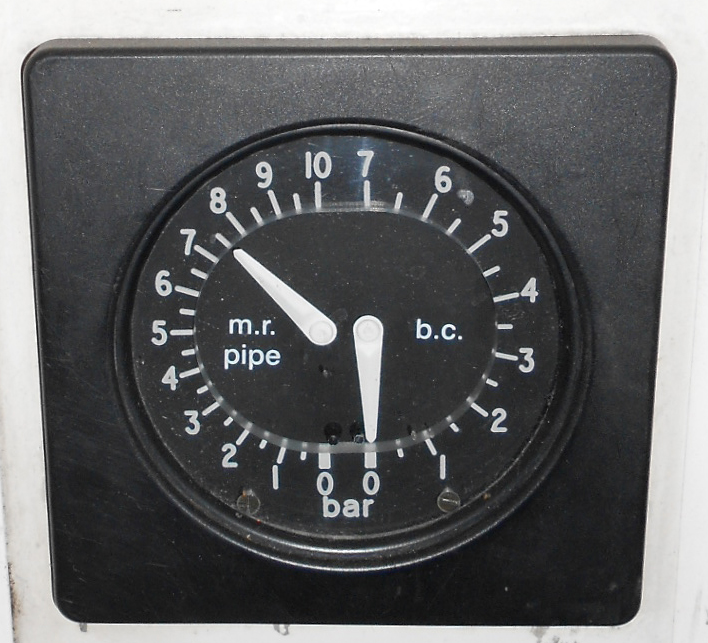
Driver's duplex air brake gauge: The left needle shows the pressure of the main reservoir pipe supplying the train, the right that of the brake cylinder, in bar.

In the early part of the 20th century, many British railways employed vacuum brakes rather than the railway air brakes used in much of the rest of the world. The main advantage of vacuum was that the vacuum can be created by a steam ejector with no moving parts (and which could be powered by the steam of a steam locomotive), whereas an air brake system requires a noisy and complicated compressor.

However, air brakes can be made much more effective than vacuum brakes for a given size of brake cylinder. An air brake compressor is usually capable of generating a pressure of 90 psi (620 kPa; 6.2 bar) vs only 15 psi (100 kPa; 1.0 bar) for vacuum. With a vacuum system, the maximum pressure differential is atmospheric pressure (14.7 psi or 101 kPa or 1.01 bar at sea level, less at altitude). Therefore, an air brake system can use a much smaller brake cylinder than a vacuum system to generate the same braking force. This advantage of air brakes increases at high altitude, e.g. Peru and Switzerland where today vacuum brakes are used by secondary railways. The much higher effectiveness of air brakes and the demise of the steam locomotive have seen the air brake become ubiquitous; however, vacuum braking is still in use in India, Argentina and South Africa, but this will be declining in near future. See Jane's World Railways.

Visual differences between the two systems are shown by air brakes working off high pressure, with the air hoses at the ends of rolling stock having a small diameter; vacuum brakes work off low pressure, and the hoses at the ends of rolling stock are of a larger diameter. Air brakes at the outermost vehicles of a train are turned off using a tap. Vacuum brakes at the outermost vehicles of a train are sealed by fixed plugs ("dummies") onto which the open end of the vacuum pipe is placed. It is sealed against a rubber washer by the vacuum, with a pin to hold the pipe in place when the vacuum drops during braking.

=== Air brake enhancements ===
One enhancement of the automatic air brake is to have a second air hose (the main reservoir or main line) along the train to recharge the air reservoirs on each wagon. This air pressure can also be used to operate loading and unloading doors on wheat wagons and coal and ballast wagons. On passenger coaches, the main reservoir pipe is also used to supply air to operate doors and air suspension.

=== Counter-pressure brake ===
The counter-pressure brake is a type of steam locomotive brake that brakes the locomotive using the driving cylinders. The brake works by using the cylinders as air compressors and converting kinetic energy into heat.

=== Dynamic brake ===
A common feature on electric and diesel-electric locomotives is the dynamic brake; this operates by using the electric motors that normally turn the wheels as an electric generator, thus slowing the train.

=== Eddy current brake ===
An eddy current brake slows or stops a train by generating eddy currents and thus dissipating its kinetic energy as heat.

=== Electropneumatic brakes ===
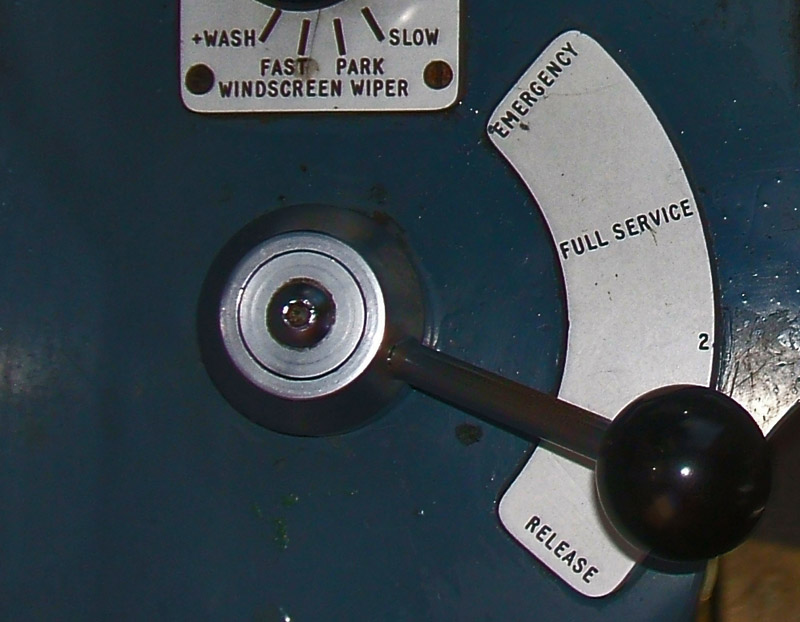
Four-step brake handle on a UK Class 317 Electric Multiple Unit

The higher performing EP brake uses a "main reservoir pipe" feeding air to all the brake reservoirs on the train, with the brake valves controlled electrically with a three-wire control circuit. If the wire is disconnected, the brakes automatically apply, so the fail-safe nature of other brake systems is retained. This provides between four and seven braking levels, depending on the class of train. It also allows for faster brake application, as the electrical control signal is propagated effectively instantly to all vehicles in the train, whereas the change in air pressure which activates the brakes in a conventional system can take several seconds or tens of seconds to propagate fully to the rear of the train. This system is not however used on freight trains due to cost.

=== Electronically controlled pneumatic brakes ===
Electronically controlled pneumatic brakes (ECP) are an American development of the late 20th Century to deal with very long and heavy freight trains, and are a development of the EP brake with even higher level of control. In addition, information about the operation of the brakes on each wagon is returned to the driver's control panel.

With ECP, a power and control line is installed from wagon to wagon from the front of the train to the rear. Electrical control signals are propagated effectively instantaneously, as opposed to changes in air pressure which propagate at a rather slow speed limited in practice by the resistance to air flow of the pipework, so that the brakes on all wagons can be applied simultaneously, or even from rear to front rather than from front to rear. This prevents wagons at the rear "shoving" wagons at the front, and results in reduced stopping distance and less equipment wear.

There are two brands of ECP brakes available in North America, one by New York Air Brake and the other by Wabtec. These two types are interchangeable.

=== Heberlein brake ===
A Heberlein brake is a continuous railway brake used in Germany that is applied by means of a mechanical cable. Train braking is therefore initiated centrally from the locomotive using a winder. This causes the brake clips to be applied on individual wagons, assisted by a servo system which makes use of the rotation of the axle. The brakes operate automatically if the cable snaps.

=== Steam brake ===
A steam brake is a type of brake for steam locomotives and their tenders, whereby a steam cylinder works directly on the brake linkages.

== Reversibility ==
Brake connections between wagons may be simplified if wagons always point the same way. An exception would be made for locomotives which are often turned on turntables or triangles.

On the Fortescue railway line that opened in 2008, wagons are operated in sets, although their direction changes at the balloon loop at the port. The ECP connections are on one side only and are unidirectional.

== Accidents with brakes ==
Defective or improperly-applied brakes may lead to a runaway train; in some instances this has caused train wrecks:

- Lac-Mégantic derailment, Quebec (2013), handbrakes were improperly set on unattended parked crude oil train, runaway tank cars rolled down a slope and derailed due to excessive speed on a curve in the centre of town, spilling five million litres (1,100,000 imp gal; 1,300,000 US gal) of oil and causing fires which killed 47 people.
- Democratic Republic of the Congo west of Kananga (2007) – 100 killed.
- Igandu train disaster, Tanzania (2002) – runaway backwards – 281 killed.
- Tenga rail disaster, Mozambique (2002) – runaway backwards – 192 killed.
- San Bernardino train disaster, California (1989) – brakes failed on freight train which crashed into houses
- Gare de Lyon train accident, France (1988) – valve closed by mistake leading to runaway.
- Train no. 183 disaster, Vietnam (1982) – sabotaged breaks caused the train to flip near Bàu Cá station – more than 200 killed.
- Chester General rail crash, UK (1972) – brakes failed on fuel train which hit a parked DMU
- Chapel-en-le-Frith, Great Britain (1957) – broken steam pipe made it impossible for crew to apply brakes.
- Federal Express train wreck, Union station, Washington, DC, (1953) – valve closed by badly designed bufferplate.
- Torre del Bierzo rail disaster, Spain (1944) – brakes failed on overloaded passenger train which collided with another in a tunnel; a third train was unaware and also crashed into it.
- Saint-Michel-de-Maurienne derailment, France 1917 – runaway train on 3.3 percent grade, with air brakes on only 3 of 19 cars and on locomotive unable to keep train below authorized speed - 700 killed.
- Armagh rail disaster, Northern Ireland (1889) – runaway backwards led to change in law.
- Shipton-on-Cherwell train crash, Oxford (1874) – caused by fracture of a carriage wheel.

== Gallery ==
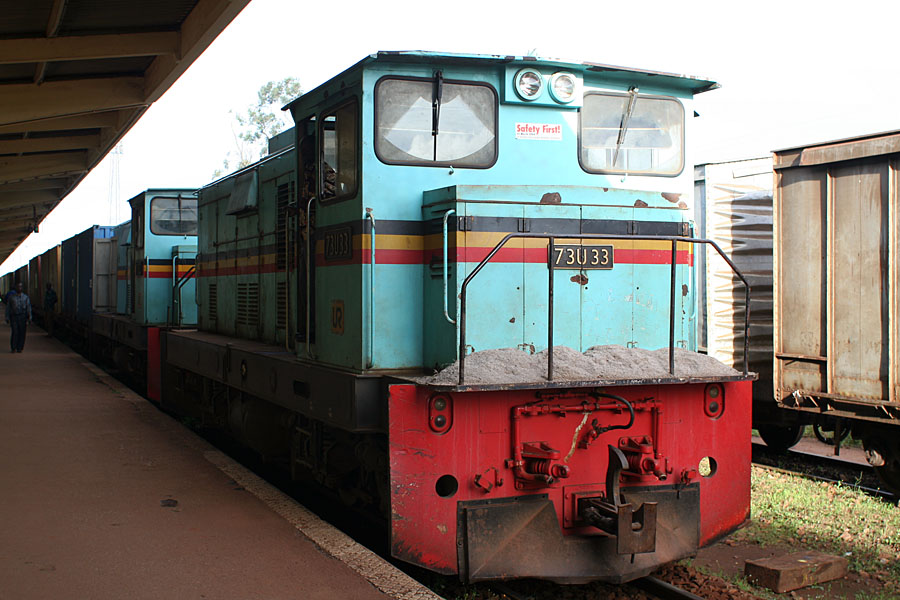
Loco from Uganda with small air brake hose above coupling and tap

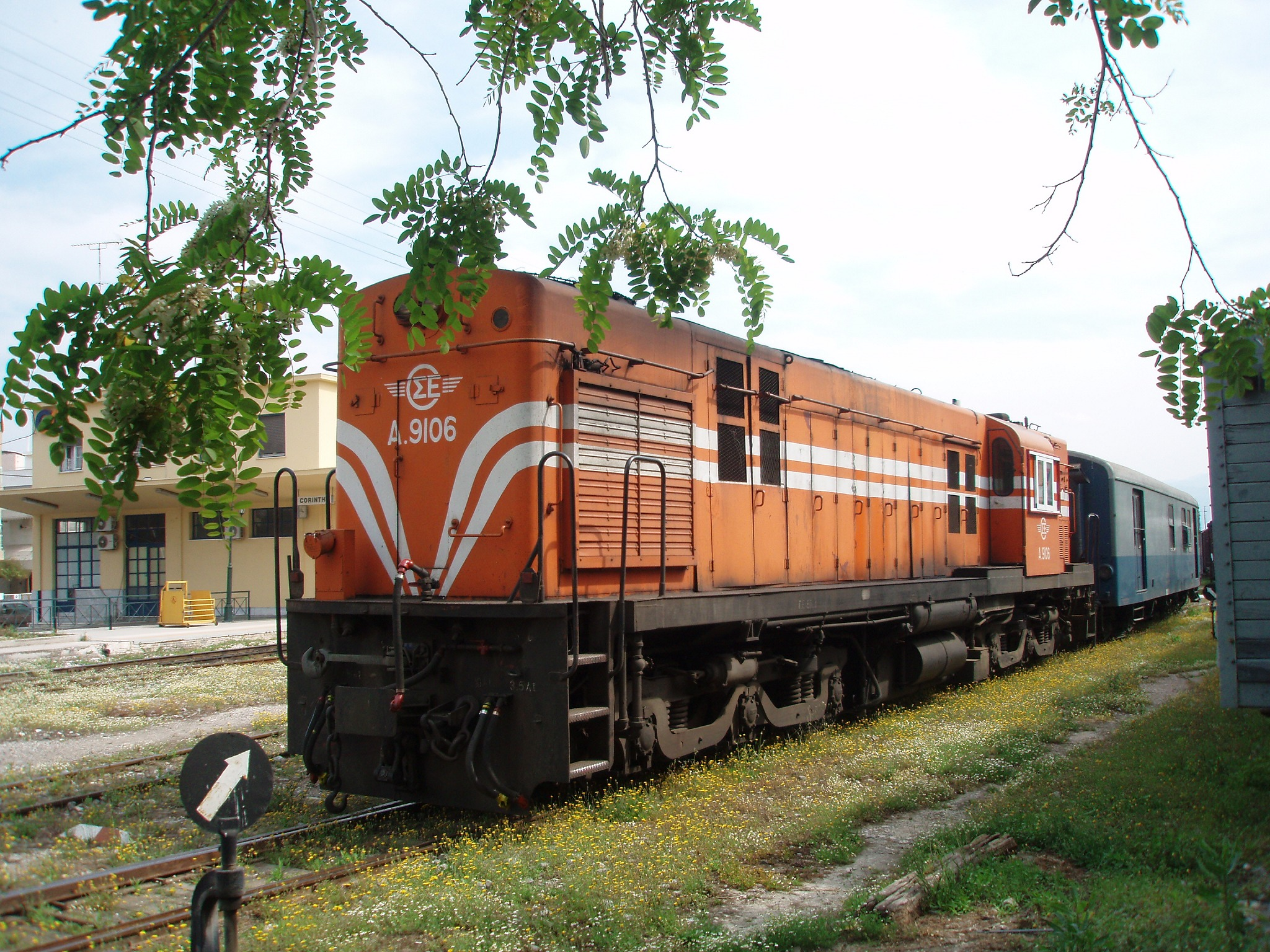
Greece NG air brake, thin hose above and tap

== See also ==
- Counterweight brake
- Driver's brake valve
- Dual brake
- Dynamic brake
- Eddy current brake
- Electromagnetic brake
- Emergency brake (train)
- Gladhand connector
- Heberlein brake
- Railway air brake
- Railway disc brake
- Regenerative brake
- Riggenbach counter-pressure brake
- Track brake
- Vacuum brake
- Yaw brake

=== Manufacturers ===
- The Rane Group of Companies (Rane Brake Lining Limited), Chennai, Tamil Nadu, India
- Westinghouse Air Brake Company (WABCO), later Wabtec, United States
- Faiveley Transport, France
- Knorr-Bremse Rail Vehicle Systems, Germany
- Westinghouse Brake and Signal Company Ltd (now a division of Knorr-Bremse), UK
- New York Air Brake (now a division of Knorr-Bremse), United States
- MTZ TRANSMASH, Russia
- MZT HEPOS, Macedonia (now a division of Wabtec)
- Mitsubishi Electric, Japan
- Nabtesco, Japan
- Dellner, Sweden
- Aflink, South Africa
- Hanning & Kahl GmbH LRT trains, Hydraulic Brakes and control components, Germany
- Voith, Germany
- YUJIN Machinery Ltd, South Korea

== Sources ==
- British Transport Commission, London (1957:142). Handbook for Railway Steam Locomotive Enginemen
