= Tenga =

Tenga may refer to:

== People ==
- Tenga Rinpoche

== Historical currency ==
- Bukharan tenga, in Central Asia
- Khwarazmi (Khiva) tenga, in Central Asia
- Kokand tenga, in Central Asia

== Geography ==
- Tenga Valley, Arunachal Pradesh India
- Tenga River
- Tenga, Altai Republic, a rural locality in Russia
- Tenga, Mozambique, a town
- Tenga, Mull, a place on the Isle of Mull, Argyll and Bute, Scotland

== Other ==
- Tenga (company), a Japanese manufacturer of adult toys
- the Tenga Warriors who served Rita Repulsa in the 3rd season of Power Rangers

== See also ==
- Tegna (disambiguation)
