= 1982 in rail transport =

This article lists events related to rail transport that occurred in 1982.

== Events ==
=== January events ===
- January 2 – a SEPTA train collides with a tanker truck at Southampton, killing 1 and injuring 5.
- January 13 – The 1982 Washington Metro train derailment involves an Orange Line train in Downtown Washington, D.C. in the United States and kills three people.
- January 26 – The Palace on Wheels luxury train begins to run on Indian Railways.
- January 27 – The Bouhalouane train crash in Algeria kills 131 people.

=== March events ===
- March 16 – An extension of the Namboku Subway Line in Sapporo, Japan, opens for service between Shin-Sapporo Station and Shiroishi Station.

=== April events ===
- April 1 – most rail operations in New Zealand of the Government-owned railways were transferred from the New Zealand Railways Department to the New Zealand Railways Corporation.
- April 6 – Opening of the Wells and Walsingham Light Railway in Norfolk, England, at 6.5 km (4.0 mi) probably the longest public 10 1/4 in (260 mm) gauge miniature railway in the world.

=== May events ===
- The last freight trains passed over the Dumbarton Cut-off.

=== June events ===
- June 23 – The Tōhoku Shinkansen line in Japan opens between Omiya (near Tokyo) and Morioka.
- June 25 – Opening of the Furka (Base) Tunnel (15.4 km (9.6 mi)) on the metre gauge Furka Oberalp Bahn in Switzerland between Oberwald and Realp.

=== July events ===
- July 28 – Fire destroys the Harrisonburg, Virginia, offices of the former Chesapeake Western Railway, which had been merged into the Norfolk and Western Railway in 1954.

=== August events ===
- August 2 – Helsinki Metro opens in Finland, the World's most northern metro.

=== September events ===
- September 18 – The second stage of Brisbane, Australia, Suburban Electrification is commissioned between Bowen Hills and Shorncliffe, and also between Roma Street and Kingston.
- September 19 – Final day of PCC streetcar operation in San Francisco before all routes began full time Muni Metro light rail services through the Market Street subway.
- September 21 – Takabata Station in Nakagawa-ku, Nagoya, Aichi Prefecture, Japan, is opened.

=== October events ===
- October 23 – The first of 46 new 85-foot stainless steel electric multiple unit cars (1-46) built by Nippon-Sharyo of Nagoya, Japan are placed in service on the South Shore Line by the Northern Indiana Commuter Transportation District. These cars replaced Insull-era equipment dating back to 1926.

=== November events ===
- November 15 – The Joetsu Shinkansen opens for service between Ōmiya and Niigata, Japan.

=== December events ===
- December 29 – The Seaboard Coast Line Railroad and the Louisville and Nashville Railroad merge to form the Seaboard System Railroad.

=== Unknown date events ===
- Robert Krebs succeeds Alan Furth as president of the Southern Pacific Company, the parent company of the Southern Pacific Railroad.
