= Armagh rail disaster =

1889 train wreck in Armagh, Ireland

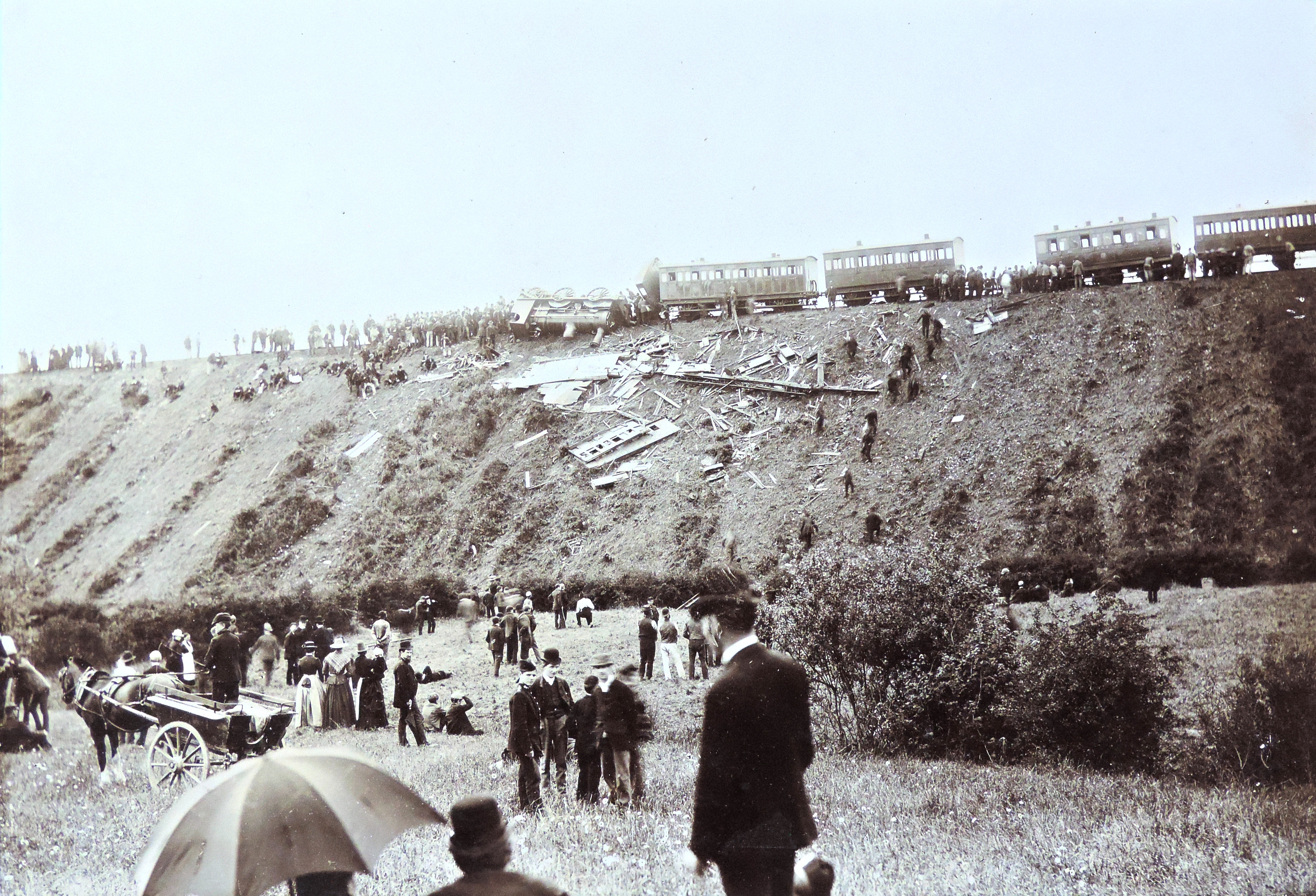
- The aftermath of the collision

- Location within island of Ireland

Details
- Date: June 12, 1889; 137 years ago c. 10:45
- Location: Armagh, County Armagh, Ireland
- Coordinates: 54°21′39″N 6°36′45″W
- Country: United Kingdom
- Line: Armagh-Newry line (closed 1933)
- Incident type: Collision
- Cause: Runaway (inadequate application of manual brakes)

Statistics
- Trains: 2
- Passengers: c. 940
- Deaths: 80
- Injured: 260

The Armagh rail disaster happened on 12 June 1889 near Armagh, County Armagh, in Ireland, when a crowded Sunday school excursion train had to negotiate a steep incline; the steam locomotive was unable to complete the climb and the train stalled. The train crew decided to divide the train and take forward the front portion, leaving the rear portion on the running line. The rear portion was inadequately braked and ran back down the gradient, colliding with a following train.

Eighty people were killed and 260 were injured, about a third of them children. It was the worst rail disaster in the United Kingdom in the nineteenth century, and to this day remains the worst railway disaster in Irish history. (Note: The worst railway accident to have occurred in the present-day Republic of Ireland was the Straffan rail accident of 1853, with 18 dead and 2 injured.) It is the fourth worst railway accident in the history of the United Kingdom.

At the time, the disaster led directly to various safety measures becoming legal requirements for railways in the United Kingdom. This was important both for the measures introduced and for the move away from voluntarism and towards more direct state intervention in such matters.

== Circumstances of the accident ==
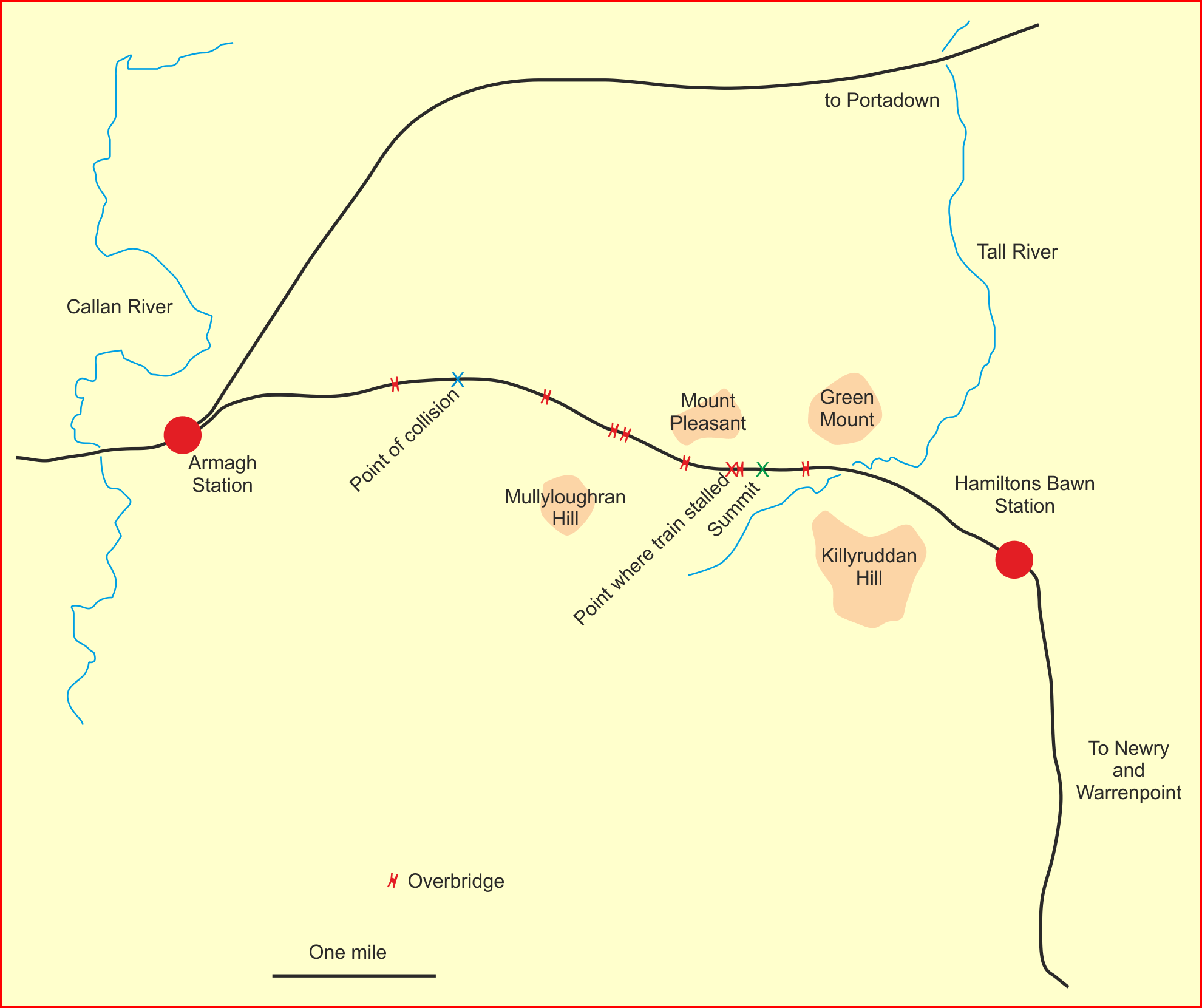
Map showing location of the Armagh railway disaster

=== The excursion sets out ===
Armagh Methodist Sunday School had organised a day trip to the seaside resort of Warrenpoint, County Down, a distance of about 24 miles (39 km). A special Great Northern Railway of Ireland (GNR(I)) train was arranged for the journey, intended to carry about eight hundred passengers.

The railway route was steeply graded and curved, and the first two and a half miles (4.0 km) from Armagh railway station involved a steep continuous climb, up a gradient of 1 in 82 (1.22%) and then 1 in 75 (1.33%). Elsewhere on the line, there were gradients as severe as 1 in 70.2 (1.42%).

Asked to provide rolling stock for a special train to take 800 excursionists, the locomotive department at Dundalk sent fifteen vehicles hauled by a 'four-coupled' (Note: the familiar Whyte notation was not yet in use (first used in 1900)) (2-4-0) locomotive; (Note: https://steamindex.com/locotype/gnri.htm gives a catalogue raisonée of the various engines of the GNR(I). From the details given in the accident report, the excursion train engine appears to have been one of the GNR(I)'s H class) however, the instructions to the engine driver, Thomas McGrath, were that the train was to be of thirteen vehicles. There were more intending passengers than anticipated and, to accommodate the excursion, the Armagh station master decided to use all fifteen vehicles. McGrath, who had never driven the route before (but had been over it with excursion trains when a fireman), objected to these instructions, saying that his instructions were that the train was to be of thirteen vehicles at most. According to the driver:

The station-master replied "I did not write those instructions for you"; I said "Mr. Cowan [the company's general manager] wrote them." The station-master then said "Any driver that comes here does not grumble about taking an excursion train with him." I replied "Why did you not send proper word to Dundalk, and I should have a proper six-wheel coupled engine (Note: https://steamindex.com/locotype/gnri.htm shows the GNR(I) to have had no passenger locomotives more powerful than the 2-4-0 but a number of 0-6-0 heavy goods engines with larger cylinders and smaller driving wheels and hence better suited to heavy loads) with me." I said no more, but walked away down the platform, this was about ten minutes before the train started.

— Evidence of Thomas McGrath, Accident report

Two other witnesses said that McGrath had asked for a second engine if more carriages were added and had been refused by the station master, as none were available; McGrath (in supplementary evidence given "through the railway company's officers") denied this. The station master's evidence was that the discussion was about adding further carriages to the fifteen with which the locomotive had arrived. (Note: It is not clear that all witnesses agreed as to whether brake-vans counted as carriages or vehicles, the string with which the locomotive arrived is variously described as fifteen vehicles, fifteen carriages, and thirteen vehicles and two brake vans) The general manager's chief clerk was to accompany the excursion; he suggested that the engine of the routine train that would be following twenty minutes behind could assist the excursion up the bank, or that some carriages could be left to come on with the routine train. Following his conversation with the station master, however, McGrath refused the assistance.

The train therefore set off with fifteen carriages, containing about 940 passengers. (Note: The 1881 Census for Ireland reports the population of the parliamentary borough of Armagh to have been under 9,000. The organisers of the excursion subsequently were sent a bill for £39 4s 3d for 941 excursion tickets to Warrenpoint (Birmingham Daily Post, Monday 1 July 1889), for which the railway company later apologised) The carriages were full, and some passengers travelled with the guards. Tickets were checked before setting off and to prevent people without tickets joining the excursion; once each compartment had been checked its doors were locked. (Note: This was described as standard practice for excursions, however it was contrary to Board of Trade recommendations made after a railway fire at Versailles in 1842 (that one door to a compartment should not be locked) and after the Abergele rail disaster in 1868 (that all doors should be unlocked).)

Initially the train made progress up the steep gradient at about 10 mph (16 km/h) but stalled about 200 yards (180 m) before the top of the gradient.

=== Dividing the excursion train ===
To prevent the train rolling back, the brakes were applied. The train did have continuous brakes, (i.e., all carriages had brakes which could be operated by the driver), but they were of the non-automatic vacuum type. They were applied by creation of vacuum in the brake pipes and released by admitting air to the pipe.

This was the opposite of the arrangement preferred by the Board of Trade ('automatic continuous brakes') in which brakes were held off by vacuum (or compressed air) generated by the engine, so that on loss of vacuum (e.g. from a leaky connection or a connection parting) the brakes came on automatically. The two brake vans, however, (one immediately behind the engine tender, the other at the rear of the train) also had hand-operated brakes, each under the control of a guard. These were applied. (Note: according to the guards)

The chief clerk directed the train crew to divide the train and proceed with the front portion to Hamilton's Bawn station, about two miles (3.2 km) away, and leave that portion there, and return for the second portion. Owing to limited siding capacity at Hamilton's Bawn, only the front five vehicles could be taken on there; so the rearmost ten vehicles would have to be left standing on the running line. Once this rear portion was uncoupled from the front portion, the continuous brakes on it would be released, and the only brakes holding it against the gradient would be the hand-operated brakes in the rear brake van.

For a goods (freight) train in a similar situation, the wheels would have been 'scotched' (Note: wedged or chocked, see wikt:scotch#Verb 4) against roll-back, and guard's vans on goods trains carried 'sprags' (Note: pieces of wood to place in between wheel spokes in order to prevent rotation, see wikt:sprag#Verb 1) with which to do this. Those on passenger trains with continuous brakes were not required to carry sprags, and the excursion train did not. The guard in the rear van having applied his handbrake then (on the instructions of the chief clerk) dismounted and scotched the wheels of his van with pieces of ballast. He then also scotched the near rearmost vehicle on its righthand wheels and intended to similarly scotch its lefthand wheels before going back down the track with flags and detonators to protect the train from the scheduled service which was to set off from Armagh 20 minutes after the excursion.

The train was screw-coupled; each carriage was first coupled by a loose chain and hook coupling to the next; the slack on this was then taken up by a turnbuckle screw arrangement, until the buffers of the two carriages were touching. To uncouple, there needed to be some slack in the coupling; as the train had stopped all the couplings were under tension. Once the vacuum brake connection to the rear portion was broken, any attempt to introduce slack into the coupling between the two portions would be defeated by the rear portion settling back to rest its weight upon the rear van brakes. To assist uncoupling the front van guard therefore scotched one of the wheels of the sixth vehicle, that is, the front vehicle of the rear portion being detached. Loosening the turnbuckle thus transferred the weight of the rear portion to the scotch on the sixth vehicle, rather than to the rear van brakes. The couplings to the rear of the sixth vehicle remained under tension, and the slack introduced remained in the coupling between the fifth and sixth vehicles, which could be unhooked.

=== The rear carriages run away ===
The uncoupling accomplished by the front van guard, the driver attempted to start the front portion away. It rolled back slightly, (Note: 12 or 18 inches (30 or 46 centimetres) in the opinion of the front guard – Accident return – evidence of William Moorehead) jolting the rear portion; which caused the wheels of the front vehicle of the rear portion to ride up over the stones underneath them. The rear portion had been standing with its couplings tight, but now only the rear two vehicles were in any way restrained, so that the leading eight vehicles of the rear portion fell back on to them.

The momentum of the eight vehicles closing on the rear two was sufficient to push them over the stones, crushing them in turn, so that now only the handbrake on the rear brake van was effective. It was overcome by the weight of ten vehicles, and the rear portion began to move downhill and gathered speed down the steep gradient back towards Armagh Station.

... as I was putting down the last stone, I felt the carriages coming back. I went on the van, and got in, and tried, with the assistance of two passengers, to get an extra turn at the brake handle, and was still doing this when Mr. Elliott [the chief clerk] jumped up on the left step, and said Try and make the best you can without breaking it [meaning the brake handle], and I said I could make no more. He then said, "Oh, my God, we will be all killed", and jumped off. The speed then gradually increased, until it became so fast that we could not see the hedges as we passed.

— Accident return – evidence of Thomas Henry

The train crew reversed the front portion and tried to catch the rear portion and re-couple it, but this proved to be impossible.

=== Collision ===
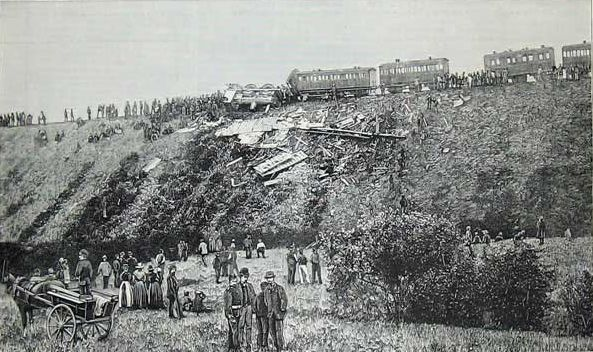
Contemporary photograph of the aftermath of the runaway

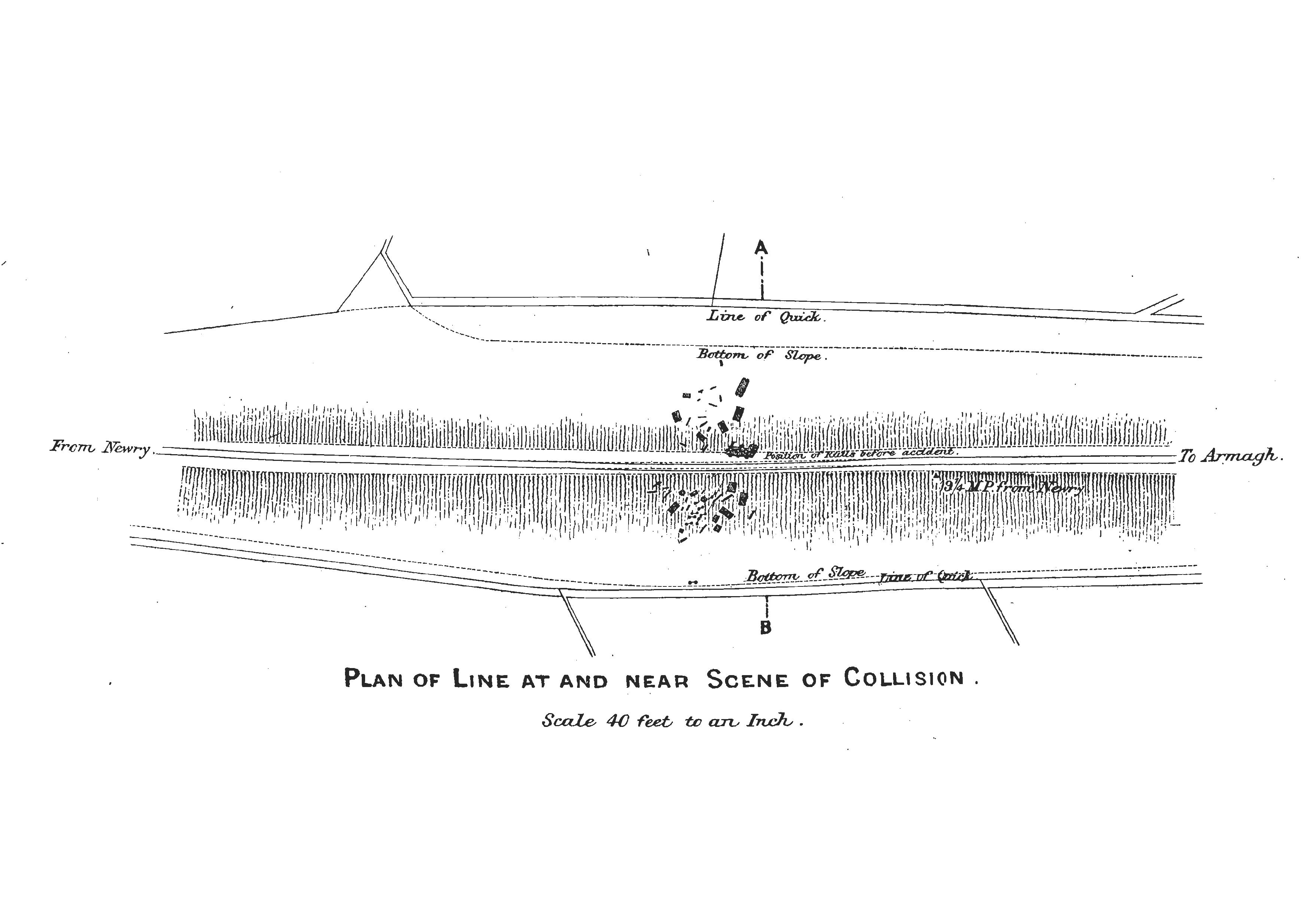
Board of Trade plan of accident site

The line was operated on the time interval system (rather than block working) so that there was no means at Armagh of knowing that the line was not clear. The required 20-minute interval before letting a fast train follow a slow one having elapsed, the following scheduled passenger train had left Armagh. With an engine of similar performance, but a much lighter train (six vehicles), it was managing about 25 miles per hour (40 km/h) up the gradient when, at a distance of about 500 yards (460 m), the driver of the ordinary train saw the approaching runaway train. He braked his train, and had reduced speed to 5 miles per hour (8.0 km/h) at the moment of collision. By now, the runaway train had travelled about 1 1/2 miles (2.4 km). The pursuing driver said he did not believe they had reached more than 30 miles per hour (48 km/h); the Board of Trade inspector thought 40 mph (64 km/h) a fair estimate of their speed at the collision. (Note: 1½ miles at 1 in 75 is a vertical drop of about 100 ft (30 m) and even without any friction or wind resistance, a simple conservation of energy calculation will show that the runaway train coaches could not have reached more than about 56 mph (If this seems too much like original research, note instead that the fall is slightly more than the vertical drop in Box Tunnel; Rolt op cit reports Brunel to have rebutted Dionysius Lardner's prediction of 120 mph (190 km/h) for a train going down the tunnel without brakes by showing the correct answer to be 56 mph (90 km/h)))

The engine of the scheduled train overturned, and the connection to its tender was lost. This train was also fitted with 'simple' (non-automatic) continuous vacuum brakes, and these were lost when the engine became disconnected. The train split into two sections, both running back down the gradient towards Armagh. Application of the handbrakes on the tender and on the brake van brought the front and rear halves of the scheduled train to a stop without further incident, a witness telling the inspector "The tender was slightly damaged, but none of the vehicles, and I heard from the guard that a horse in the box next the tender was not injured".

The occupants of the rear of the excursion train were not so lucky. The two rearmost vehicles of the excursion train were utterly destroyed, and the third rearmost very badly damaged. The debris tumbled down a 45-foot-high (14 m) embankment.

== Causes of the runaway ==
=== Inadequate application of brakes ===
As part of his investigations, the Board of Trade inspector carried out calculations which established that a train similar to the excursion train could be hauled over the Armagh bank at about 15 mph (24 km/h) by the excursion train engine, and supported this by a practical trial. However, he did criticise the allocation of an engine with only just enough power for such a duty, especially with a driver who had little knowledge of the route. A further practical trial showed that a single brake van, with the brake correctly working and correctly applied, could (without the aid of scotching) hold 10 carriages on the Armagh bank, against both their own weight and a nudge similar to that which witnesses agreed in describing as having been caused by run-back of the front portion of the divided train. Hence, the problem was not the inadequacy of the brake.

The immediate cause was the want of the application of sufficient brake power to hold the rear portion of the excursion train, when this portion, consisting of nine coaches and a brake van; which had been separated from the front of the train by direction of Mr. Elliott, was slightly bumped by the front portion of the train when the driver had to set back previously to starting for Hamilton's Bawn.

Two witnesses had seen the brake working properly before the train left Armagh, and the brake apparatus had been found in the wreckage and appeared to be in good working order. Nonetheless, the rear portion had run away, and had done so with the braked wheels revolving freely. Therefore, either the brake had not been applied properly by the guard, or it had been tampered with by passengers in the brake carriage. In the circumstances, the guard should be given the benefit of the doubt.

=== Incorrect response to the excursion train stalling ===
Responsibility lay primarily with Mr Elliott, the chief clerk. He had directed a course of action which ignored Company rules. These laid down that the main guard should not leave his van until perfectly satisfied that his brake would hold the train (the train should therefore have been allowed to ease back upon the rear brake van); once he had left his brake, no attempt should be made to move the train until he was back at the brake. Meanwhile, the more junior guard should have gone back down the track to protect the train. These precautions had been omitted, to pursue a strategy (dividing the train) which, even had nothing gone wrong, would have had no advantages over awaiting the scheduled train to assist the excursion to Hamilton's Bawn.

If Mr. Elliott had therefore only had the prudence to wait where the excursion train stopped near the top of the bank and to send back one of the guards to protect his train, with instructions to ask the driver of the following ordinary train to help the excursion train up the short remaining distance, he would hardly have lost time and would, besides, have avoided the risk inseparable from the delicate operation he unwisely determined to carry out and which should have been resorted to under only most exceptional circumstances and not, as in the present case, where there was so easy a solution of the difficulty.

== Other criticisms ==
=== Wrong driver, wrong engine ===
The excursion train (even in the 15-vehicle form in which it set off) should have been able to climb Armagh bank at about 15 mph (24 km/h). The inspector considered that its failure to do so must have been "due to some want of proper management of the engine" by its insufficiently experienced driver. The locomotive shed foreman at Dundalk was criticised for want of judgment in not sending a more experienced driver (Note: He suggested in his evidence that there had been no problem with the engine but the brakes had been tampered with. No reason was given in the accident return for discounting the possibility that the train had been held back by wrongly applied brakes. The Oxford Companion to British Railway History notes – in its article on brakes (p 39) – of the simple vacuum system. The erratic performance of early ejectors caused substantial fluctuations in vacuum while the brakes were off. This led to brake blocks rubbing on the wheels, not hard enough to stop the train, but wasting fuel ... It might also be noted that, when the various continuous braking systems had been trialled at Newark in 1875 on one run, the train with vacuum brakes "failed to attain sufficient speed due to imperfect release of the brake blocks".) and in his choice of engine. The 2-4-0 supplied would have had insufficient margins (even when hauling a 13-vehicle excursion train) to be sure of maintaining a safe speed (Note: The line was run on the time interval system and it was therefore dangerous to go much slower than the train behind) over the more onerous gradients farther up the line. For a 15-vehicle excursion, assistance should have been given by the engine of the regular train.

=== Failure to provide an assisting engine ===
The report criticised the "over-confidence" of the excursion engine driver as to the capabilities of his engine and regretted that his better judgment must have been overcome by the words of the Armagh station master. The chief clerk came in for further criticism for not having persisted with his instructions for the regular train engine to provide assistance. There was no direct criticism of the station master; either for having increased the size of the train, or for persuading the engine driver to attempt Armagh bank without assistance.

=== The excursion train ===
The organisation of this was criticised on a number of points:

- Passengers should not have been allowed to travel in the brake vans, "a practice that should be sternly prohibited"
- Carriage doors should not have been locked: "a wrong thing"
- Given the weight of the train and the gradients on the line, both brake vans should have been at the rear of the train
- It should not have been so big:
  The running of such heavily laden excursion trains as the present on lines with bad gradients, is a practice much to be deprecated; it would be far better to limit them to about 10 vehicles. This remark more especially applies when the station from which the train starts is like that of the Newry and Armagh line at Armagh, which, as at present arranged, is perfectly unsuited for dealing with long passenger trains. In the present instance, the train, owing to its length, had to be loaded on the main line partly at the up platform and partly at the down platform, and afterwards by a series of shunts to be moved on to the Newry and Armagh Line.

== Findings of the inquest ==
The inquest was completed on Friday 21 June 1889, and made findings of culpable negligence against six of those involved; those at Dundalk responsible for selection of the engine, the driver and both guards on the train, and Mr Elliott who had taken charge. As a result, three of the accused were committed for trial for manslaughter on the following Monday. One guard had been injured in the crash and was presumably still in hospital; the Dundalk personnel were not charged, the 'practical trial' showing that the engine supplied should not have been defeated by Armagh bank if correctly handled having been carried out on Saturday 22 June. The jury are not reported to have made any findings against more senior management of the Great Northern Railway of Ireland. Elliott was tried in Dublin in August, when the jury reported they were unable to agree; on re-trial in October he was acquitted. The cases against the other defendants were then dropped.

== Recommendation and consequent legislation ==
=== Recommendation triggering legislation ===
The key recommendation was in fact couched as a finding:

This terrible calamity would in all human probability have been prevented had the excursion train been fitted with an automatic continuous brake instead of (as it was) with only a non-automatic continuous brake. In the former case, on the dividing of the train taking place, the brake would have remained on, or (had it been previously taken off) would have been at once applied to, the rear vehicles, and these would have remained immovable, notwithstanding any possible bump they might have received from the front of the train, when the driver was setting back to make a start.

It may also be remarked that the ordinary train had a narrow escape from serious collision between the portions into which it was divided, or with buffer stops; whereas had it been supplied with an automatic brake, there would have been no risk of such collisions.

As the President of the Board of Trade has stated in Parliament his intention to introduce a Bill to make compulsory the adoption of automatic continuous brakes, should the report on this collision point out that it would have been avoided had the excursion train been fitted with them, it is unnecessary for me to say more upon the subject.

=== Regulatory background ===
For many years the Railway Inspectorate of the Board of Trade had been advocating three vital safety measures (among others) to often reluctant railway managements:

lock
interlocking of points and signals, so that conflicting signal indications are prevented
block
A space-interval or absolute block system of signalling, where one train is not allowed to enter a physical section until the preceding one had left it
brake
Continuous brakes, to put at the command of the engine driver adequate braking power; this requirement being increased as the technology made it reasonable to 'automatic' (in modern parlance 'fail-safe') continuous brakes which had to be 'held off' by vacuum or compressed air and would be applied automatically if that supply was lost (e.g. if a train were divided).

The Board of Trade had got as far and as fast as it could by persuasion, but an inspector commented in 1880 after the Wennington Junction rail crash:

It is all very well for the Midland Railway Company now to plead that they are busily employed in fitting up their passenger trains with continuous breaks, but the necessity for providing the passenger trains with a larger proportion of break power was pointed out by the Board of Trade to all Railway Companies more than 20 years since; and with the exception of a very few railway companies that recognised that necessity and acted upon it, it may be truly stated that the principal Railway Companies throughout the Kingdom have resisted the efforts of the Board of Trade to cause them to do what was right, which the latter had no legal power to enforce, and even now it will be seen by the latest returns laid before Parliament that some of those Companies are still doing nothing to supply this now generally acknowledged necessity

=== Questions in Parliament ===
In the aftermath of the accident, questions to the President of the Board of Trade Sir Michael Hicks Beach revealed that

- in the whole of Ireland only one engine and six vehicles were equipped with an automatic continuous brake
- in England 18% of the passenger rolling stock had no continuous brake, and a further 22% had non-automatic brakes
- in Scotland 40% of the passenger rolling stock were without continuous brakes

More specifically, for the Great Northern of Ireland:

- in March 1888 there were 208 drivers and firemen employed and 693 occasions on which they worked a 14-hour day or longer, including two in which they worked over 18 hours (Note: The questioner (the MP for West Belfast) also alleged the two men who acted as guards on the excursion train that met with the fatal disaster were untried men, shunters at Newry Station, and had no knowledge of the line or of the duties of a guard, and that one of them, Moorhead, had been on duty 16 hours the previous day, and also from four o'clock that morning, and that his wages were 11s. per week which somewhat overstated the case; they had served as guards from time to time in the past.)
- of the 518 miles of railway it worked, only 23 were worked on the block system
- It had no engines or vehicles whose brakes met the requirements of the Board of Trade, furthermore:

Mr. Channing (Northamptonshire, E.): I beg to ask the President of the Board of Trade whether 11 years ago, in reporting upon a serious collision on the Great Northern of Ireland Railway, between two portions of a train which had become separated, General Hutchinson pointed out to the Company that an automatic brake would have absolutely prevented the collision, by arresting the carriages the moment the separation occurred; whether at that time the secretary of the company informed General Hutchinson that the simple vacuum brake, whose failure caused this accident, was being merely tried experimentally on the line, and that the company had not yet come to a decision as to what brake would be finally adopted; and, whether, in spite of this recommendation, this simple vacuum brake, upon the failure of which General Hutchinson reported in 1878, has remained in use on the Great Northern of Ireland line ever since, and is the same brake that was in use in the recent disastrous collision near Armagh? Sir M. Hicks Beach: The facts are as stated in the question.

=== New legislation ===
The government was already short of parliamentary time in which to pass legislation it was already committed to, and had promised to introduce no further controversial measures. A bill was drafted and introduced, only to be withdrawn when it became clear that some of its other provisions (most notably requiring specified improvements in couplings, so that those engaged in shunting could safely uncouple wagons without having to step into the gap between them) were sufficiently contentious as to jeopardise passage of the non-controversial portions of the bill. For that reason, some Liberal MPs sympathetic to railwaymen's concerns on working hours and the hazards of shunting (Note: amongst them noticeably the MP for Crewe) expressed disappointment that the bill did not go far enough. On the other hand, during the second reading a Liberal MP made the classic argument against detailed and prescriptive regulation:

It would be a very serious thing if the Government in its attempt to protect the lives of passengers by rail, and the lives of working men, should take on itself to decide what form of carriage, what form of coupling and break, is the proper form for railway companies to use. I am of opinion that the lives of passengers and railway men will be safer in the long run, if these matters are left in the hands of those who understand them best. I cordially approve of the pressure of public opinion being applied, through this House or through the Press, to railway managers, to compel them to consider both the safety of the public and the safety of their men; but if we endeavour in this matter—as we have, in my opinion, sadly too often endeavoured in the past—to give Government officials the power to decide what is the precise form of appliances which shall be used in connection with railways, we shall not be providing for the safety of the public or the safety of railway servants.

Nonetheless, within two months of the Armagh disaster Parliament had enacted the Regulation of Railways Act 1889, which authorised the Board of Trade to require the use of continuous automatic brakes on passenger railways, along with the block system of signalling and the interlocking of all points and signals. This is often taken as the beginning of the modern era in UK rail safety.

An exceptionally frightful ... [accident] ... in 1889 prompted the passing of a new Regulation Act, two features of which were notable. First, Parliament rushed the Bill through all its stages at an exceptionally high speed. The accident itself occurred on 12 June; the act went into force on 30 August. And secondly, here at last the government accepted the responsibility for dictating methods of operation to the companies, requiring all lines carrying passenger trains to be worked on the block system and all such trains to be fitted with instantaneously working continuous brakes, the Board of Trade being authorised to fix time limits for completion of the work With an ill grace and some shuffling, the companies implemented the Act. As soon as they had done so, serious accidents caused by inadequate braking ceased in Britain ... Here was the most striking example of the direct intervention of the state in the working of British railways in the 19th century, and it proved entirely beneficent.

== Similar accidents ==
- Round Oak rail accident – 1 in 75; 23 August 1858 – Excursion runaway; brake not applied
- Abergele rail disaster – 26 August 1868 – Brake broken by rough shunting
- Stairfoot rail accident – 12 September 1870 – Poorly secured wagons runaway due to rough shunting
- Murulla railway accident (26 killed) – 13 September 1926 – Air brake failure
- Bouhalouane train crash (131 killed) – 27 January 1982 – Passenger carriage roll back after being disconnected from a locomotive on a steep slope.
- 13 die near Kisumu, Kenya, after a passenger train rolls back because of air brake failure – 15 August 2000
- Tenga rail disaster – 25 May 2002
- Igandu train disaster – 24 June 2002

== See also ==
- History of rail transport in Ireland
- Lists of rail accidents
- List of steepest gradients on adhesion railways

== Notes and references ==
Notes
