= Igandu train collision =

2002 public transit disaster in Dodoma, Tanzania

Coordinates: 6°17′49″S 36°05′24″E

Igandu train disaster

Details
- Date: 24 June 2002
- Location: Igandu, Dodoma
- Country: Tanzania
- Line: Central Line
- Operator: Tanzania Railways Corporation
- Incident type: Runaway and Collision

Statistics
- Passengers: 1,200
- Deaths: 281
- Injured: 600

The Igandu train disaster occurred during the early morning of June 24, 2002, in Tanzania. It is one of the worst rail accidents in African history. A passenger train with over 1,200 people on board rolled backwards down a hill into a slow-moving goods train, killing 281. The cause was brake failure, with unproven claims of sabotage.

== Overview ==
The train had travelled from Dar es Salaam to the state of Dodoma in Central Tanzania, had passed Msagali, and was nearing the city of Dodoma when it began climbing the tracks at a hill called Igandu. It is believed that there was a fault with the train's brakes as it climbed the hill. The driver stopped the train near the summit of the hill, inspected and adjusted the braking system, and climbed back into the cab. When the train began moving again the brakes failed totally, causing the train to immediately begin rolling backward. The train accelerated to very high speeds as it rolled straight back down the hill, passing two train stations as it went, and finally crashed into a seemingly slow-moving goods train travelling to Dar es Salaam.

Local people joined with ambulance services to rescue as many as they could. The shortage of doctors at Dodoma hospital was so severe that the Tanzanian health minister, Anna Abdallah, was obliged to help more than 400 people who were badly injured. Rescue teams were also hampered by the lack of large cutting machinery or industrial equipment needed to cut or lift wreckage off injured people; the necessary equipment did not arrive until that evening.

Four days after the incident, the Tanzanian government released a statement to the effect that 281 people had been killed by the crash, or had died subsequently in hospital, although this number was seen as likely to increase, given the number of people critically injured. There were 88 bodies who could not be identified and who were buried in Maili Mbili graveyard outside Dodoma. State-owned Tanzania Railways Corporation (TRC) later presented individual compensation payments of between 100,000 and 500,000 shillings to the families of the victims, a pay-out which angered some people who blamed the TRC for the crash.

In the months prior to the accident, Tanzania had been searching for a private company to assume control of the dilapidated state railway system, and had been interviewing representatives of European and South African companies. Finally in 2007 the TRC was concessioned to the Rites Consortium of India in 2007, but was eventually reclaimed by the Tanzanian government in 2011.

There was also speculation, emphatically denied by both the organisation and Prime Minister Frederick Sumaye, that the crash was sabotage committed by angry train union members who were protesting the pending sale of the company, but no evidence of this has ever been provided.

== Similar accidents ==
- (United Kingdom) Armagh rail disaster (1889) – which resulted in compulsory continuous and automatic brakes and absolute block for passenger trains.
- (United Kingdom) Chapel-en-le-Frith (1957)
- (France) Gare de Lyon train accident (1988)
- (Mozambique) Tenga rail disaster (2002)
