= SNCF Class Z 5300 =

Class of French commuter train

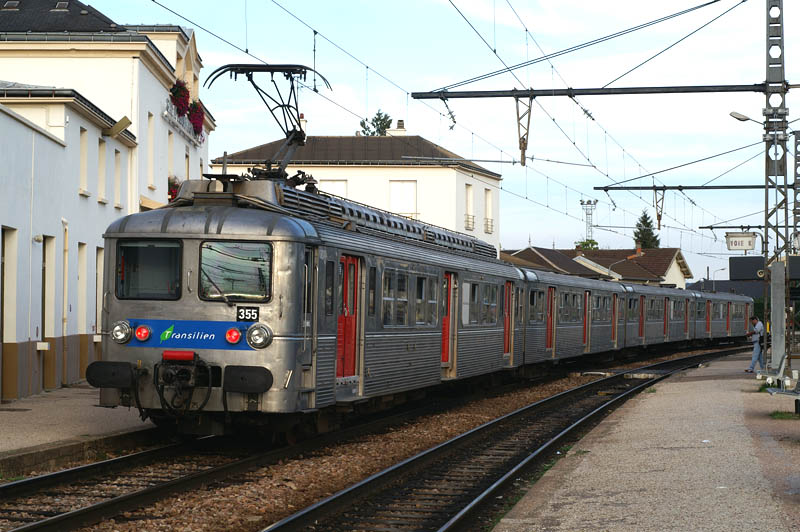
- A refurbished Z 5300 train in September 2006
- In service: 1965–2018
- Manufacturer: Carel et Fouché, MTE/Francorail, Fives-Lille, OC Oerlikon
- Constructed: 1965–1975
- Refurbished: 1978, 1992, 2005–2007
- Scrapped: 2003–
- Number built: 145 cars
- Number scrapped: 121 cars
- Successor: Z20900; Z57000
- Formation: 3 or 4 cars per trainset
- Operators: SNCF

Specifications
- Width: 2.87 m (9 ft 5 in)
- Height: 4.205 m (13 ft 9 9/16 in)
- Doors: 3 pairs per side
- Maximum speed: 130 km/h (81 mph)
- Electric system(s): Overhead line, 1,500 V DC
- Current collection: Pantograph
- Track gauge: 1,435 mm (4 ft 8 1/2 in) standard gauge

SNCF Class Z 5300 are three and four car electric multiple unit type for Paris commuter and regional services. They were built by Carel et Fouche, MTE/Francorail, Fives-Lille and OC Oerlikon between 1965 and 1968 (1st batch) and 1972 and 1975 (2nd batch). Units began to be removed from service in 2003 with the final train being withdrawn on 8 December 2018.

== Characteristics ==
These stainless steel-bodied EMUs were built as 4-car units including a driving motor car, two intermediate trailers and a driving trailer. However, some units were shortened to three or two cars by removing one or both of the intermediate trailers. Up to three elements can be coupled together to form a 12-car trainset. The power supply is 1500 V DC with electromechanical traction equipment.

=== Livery ===
As the use of stainless steel eliminates the need for painting; the units are silver, with originally only an orange stripe between the headlights. They are therefore nicknamed petit gris (i.e. "little gray", but also the name of a snail), couscoussière, "silver arrow" or "tin can". However, as some units were modified, the doors were painted red, light blue or dark blue according to the services they were intended for.

From 2011 only red-doored units remained in service; these units were fitted with EAS (équipement à agent seul, i.e. "single crew operation"), and were operated without a guard.

== Operation ==
This class operated on the following services, but was replaced by more recent stock:

- Paris-Lyon-Montereau,
- Paris-Lyon-Montargis,
- Paris-Montparnasse-Rambouillet,
- Paris-Montparnasse-Plaisir-Grignon,
- Commuter services on the southern part of RER C,
- Paris-Montparnasse-Chartres,
- Paris-Montparnasse-Le Mans,
- Paris-Austerlitz-Orléans,
- Shuttle services between Orléans and Les Aubrais (connection with mainline services) with 3-car elements,
- Shuttle services between Tours and Saint Pierre des Corps on the same principle.
- Melun-Juvisy (RER D), and
- Melun-Montereau through Héricy (Transilien, R line).

== Accidents ==
- On December 24, 1987, a Z 5300 train was involved in a collision in Issy-les-Moulineaux.
- On June 27, 1988, two Z 5300 trains collided head-on at the Gare de Lyon station in Paris. The accident left 56 dead, 57 injured, and resulted in the third deadliest peacetime rail disaster in France.

== Gallery ==
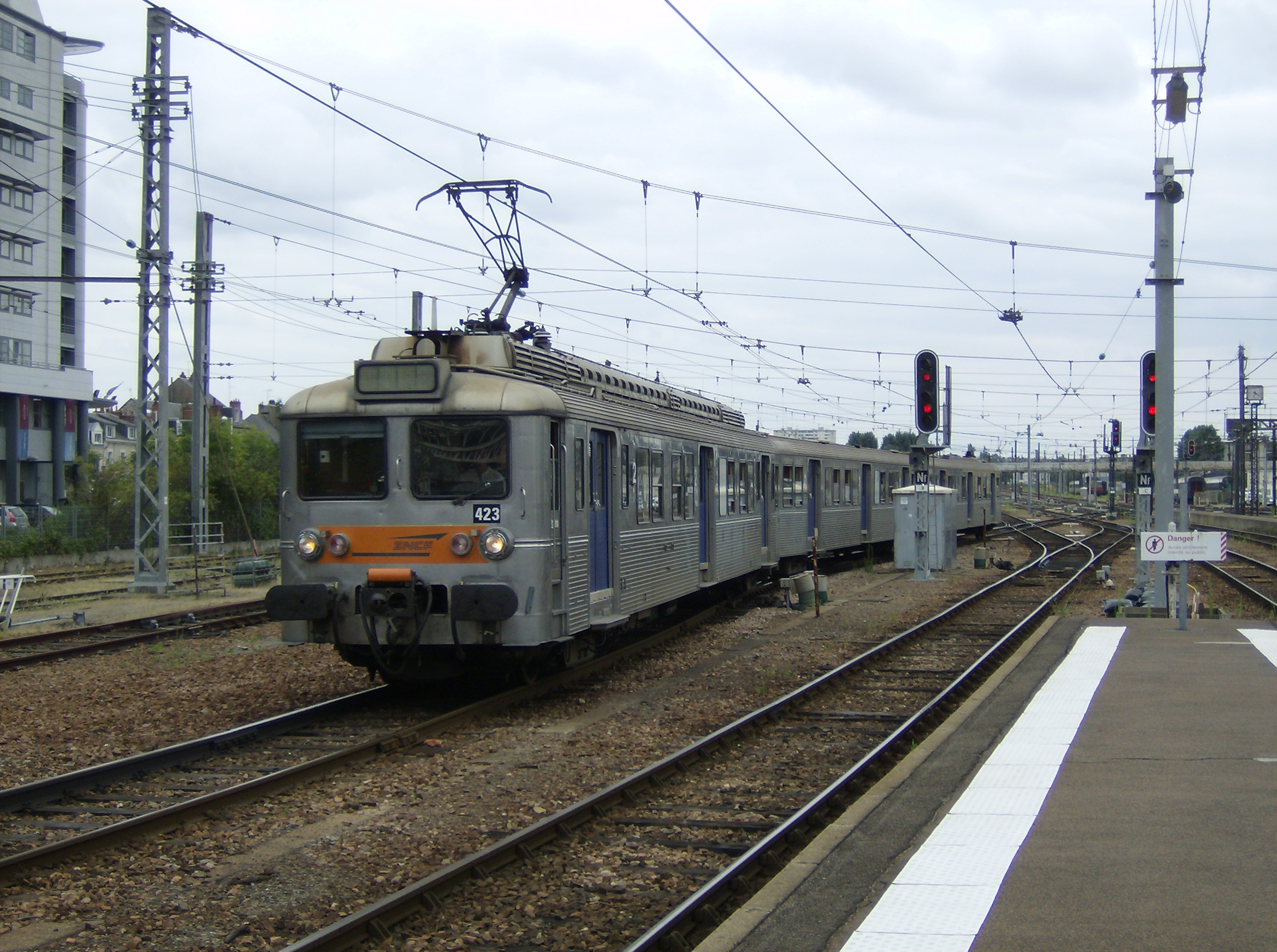
Z 5423 arriving at Tours

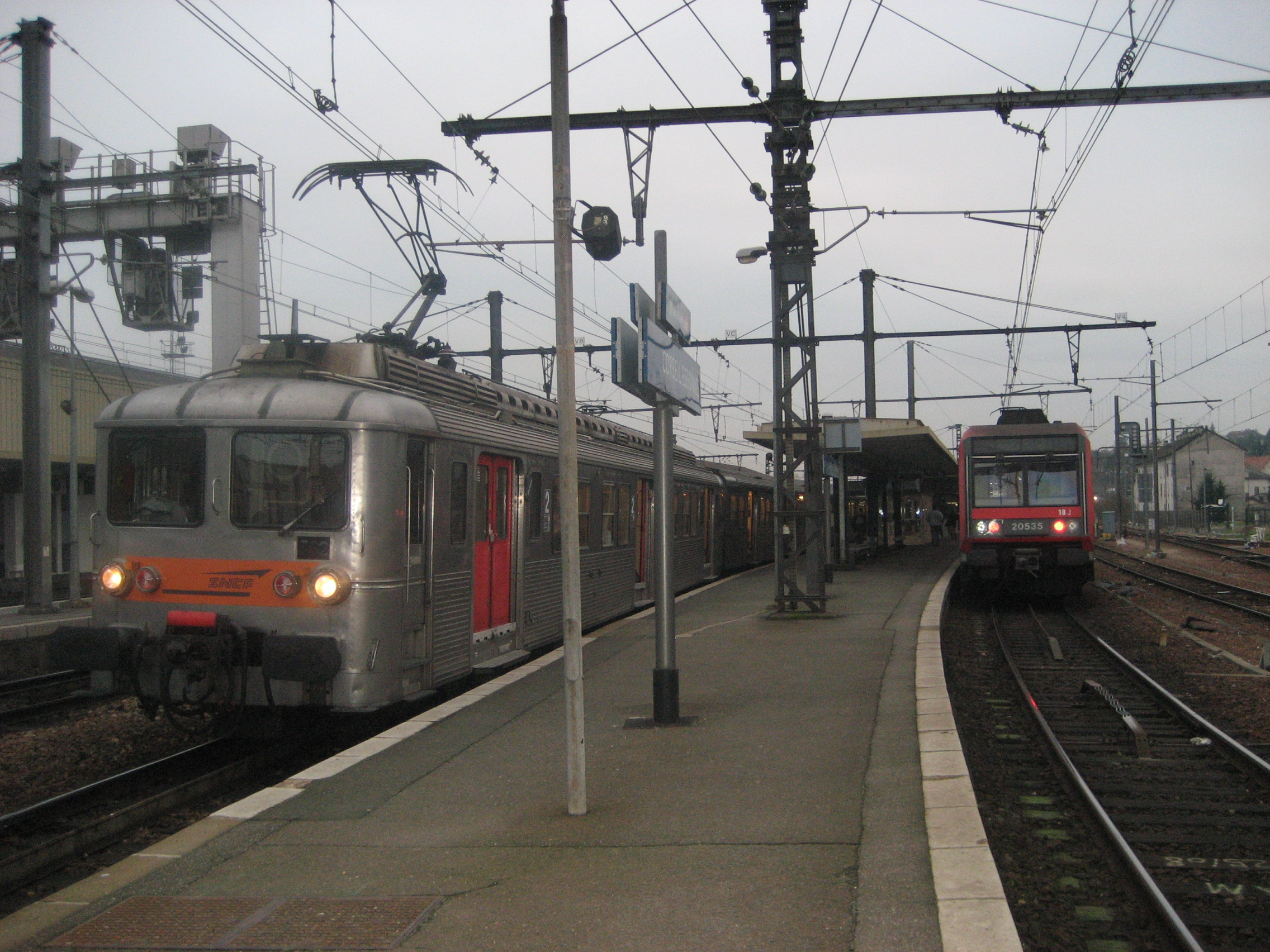
A Z5300 and Z20500 at Corbeil-Essonnes.

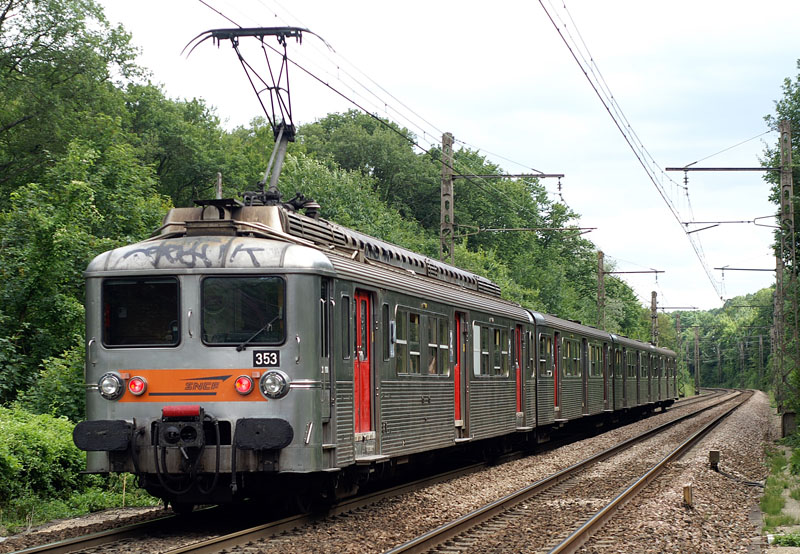
Z 5353 on a passenger service.

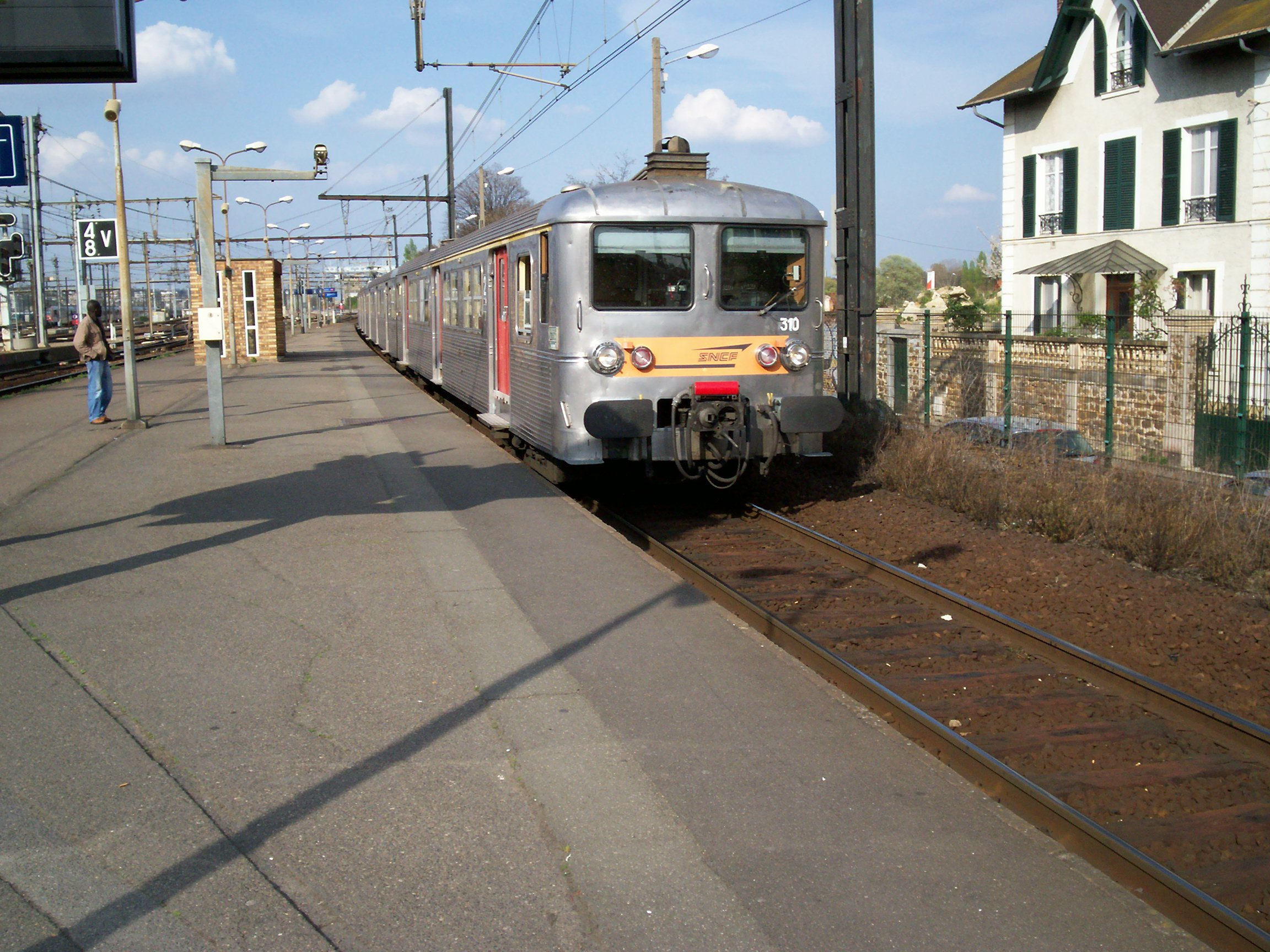
Z 5310 is seen at Juvisy on RER line D
