= Tegna =

Tegna may refer to:

- Tegna, Switzerland, a former municipality in the district of Locarno
- Tegna Inc., an American broadcast, digital media and marketing services company

== See also ==
- Tenga (disambiguation)
