= Tenga rail disaster =

2002 railway incident in Mozambique

Coordinates: 25°44′52″S 32°23′50″E

Details
- Date: 25 May 2002; 5:00 am
- Location: Tenga
- Country: Mozambique
- Line: Maputo railroad / CFM Sul
- Operator: Mozambique Ports and Railways
- Incident type: Runaway

Statistics
- Trains: 1
- Deaths: 192
- Injured: 167

The Tenga rail disaster of 25 May 2002 occurred at Tenga 40 km north-west from Maputo, Mozambique causing 192 deaths and 167 injured.

== Overview ==
The train comprised carriages containing 600 people and several wagons loaded with South African cement. The carriages were uncoupled about 5 km from Tenga, possibly as part of a manoeuvre by the train crew. The carriages then rolled down the line into Tenga, and crashed into the stationary rail wagons loaded with cement from the train which were coupled to the locomotive. Three days of mourning were declared by then President of Mozambique Joaquim Chissano.

== Cause ==
The crash was blamed on human error and a manoeuvre that went wrong. It appears that the crew were intending to go back and pick up the carriages. The worst casualties were in the first two carriages. Hence it appears that the carriages crashed into part of the same train, not a following train.

== Similar accidents ==
- (United Kingdom) Armagh rail disaster (1889)
- (United Kingdom) Chapel-en-le-Frith (1957)
- (France) Gare de Lyon train accident (1988)
- (Tanzania) Igandu train disaster (2002)

== See also ==
- Railway stations in Mozambique
