= Tenga, Mozambique =

Town in Mozambique

Tenga
- Town
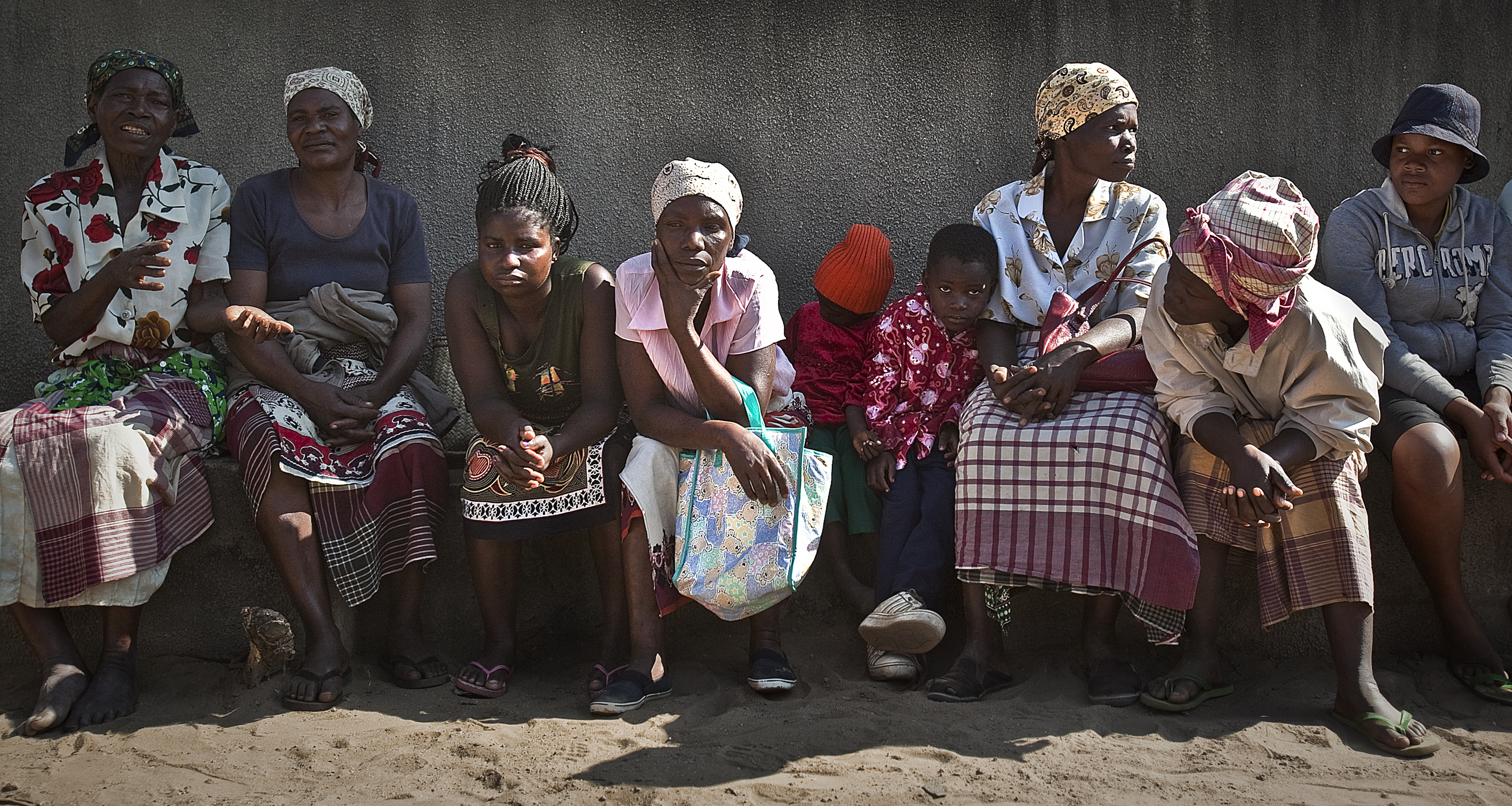
- Tengan women waiting to see medical personnel.

- Location within Mozambique
- Coordinates: 25°44′54.86″S 32°23′52.78″E
- Country: Mozambique
- Province: Maputo
- Time zone: UTC+2:00 (CAT)

Tenga is a town in Mozambique, near Maputo.

== Transport ==
It is served by a station on the national railway network.

=== Incidents ===
The Tenga rail disaster in 2002 caused a large number of fatalities.

== See also ==
- Railway stations in Mozambique
