= Gare de Lyon rail accident =

1988 public transit disaster in Paris, France

Coordinates: 48°50′41″N 2°22′25″E

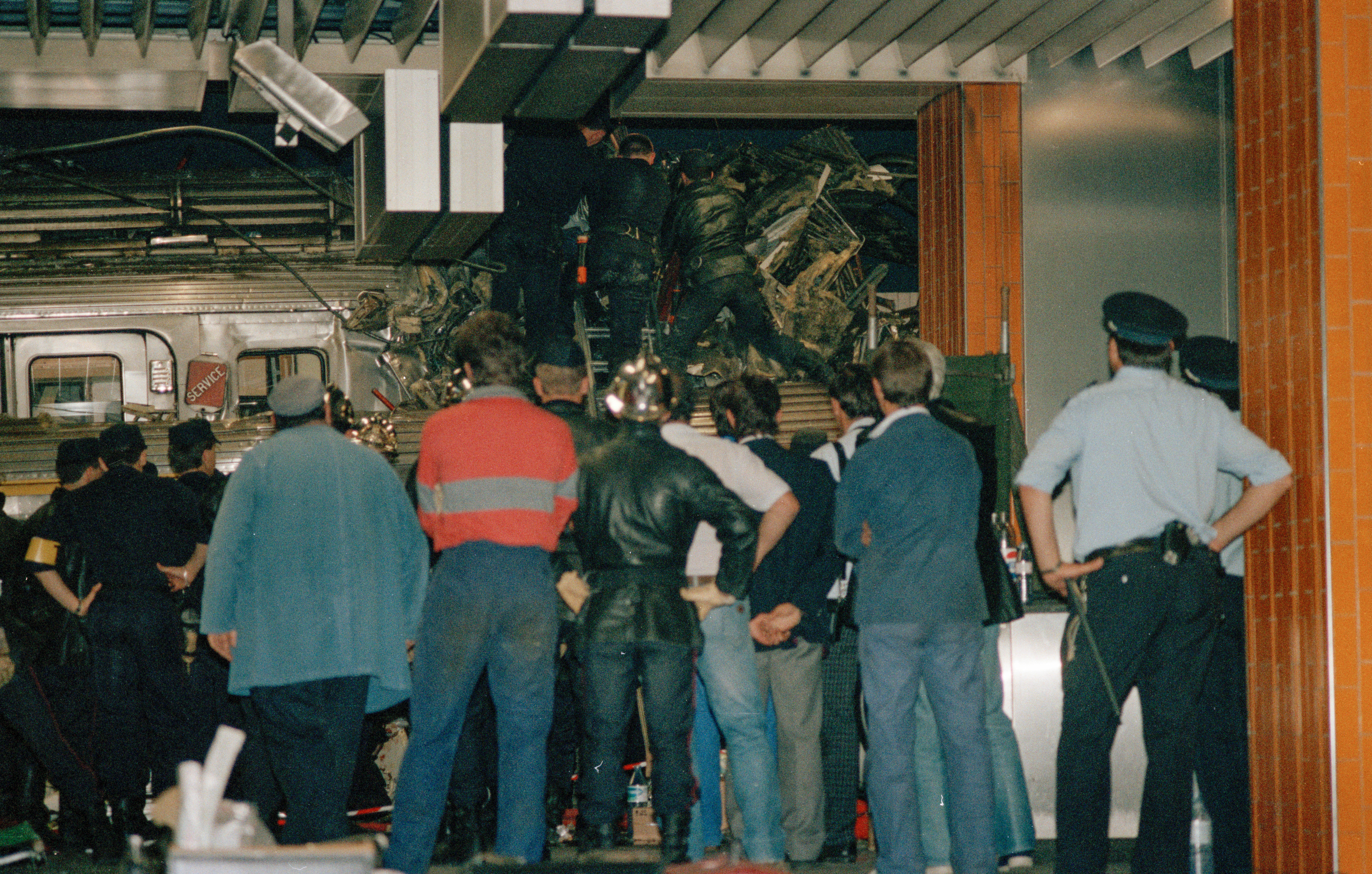
- Rescue team operating on trainwreck

Details
- Date: 27 June 1988; 19:09
- Location: Paris-Gare de Lyon rail station
- Country: France
- Line: Melun-Paris Commuter Service
- Operator: SNCF
- Incident type: Head-on collision
- Cause: Disabling of braking system caused by driver error

Statistics
- Trains: Two SNCF Class Z 5300 electric multiple units
- Deaths: 56
- Injured: 57

The Gare de Lyon rail accident (French: Accident ferroviaire de la gare de Lyon), occurred on 27 June 1988, when an SNCF commuter train headed inbound to Paris's Gare de Lyon terminal crashed into a stationary outbound train, killing 56 and injuring 57, resulting in the deadliest rail disaster in peacetime France and the third deadliest in the nation's history.

== Overview ==
On 27 June 1988, SNCF commuter train 153944 inbound to Paris' Gare de Lyon terminal from Melun to the southeast was running its routine 80 km journey, using one of SNCF's electric multiple units, Class Z 5300. As the train neared Paris, it passed the Le Vert de Maisons station, which was usually a stop on the route. However, SNCF had recently implemented a new summer timetable, which meant train 153944 no longer stopped at the station.

As the train pulled past the platform, a passenger in the second car of the train suddenly stood, pulled the emergency brake, and left the train. Driver Daniel Saulin, assisted by Guard Jean-Charles Bovée, after working for 26 minutes, reset the brakes and continued. This procedure had taken longer than usual, prompting more passengers to leave the train. To make up the lost time, the station controller at Gare de Lyon, André Tollance, instructed Saulin to skip the next scheduled stop (and the last before the terminal), Maisons-Alfort–Alfortville.

After the train passed Maisons-Alfort–Alfortville, it reached a 4% grade that led to Gare de Lyon. When Saulin passed a yellow signal instructing him to slow the train in preparation for being switched to an empty platform, Saulin discovered his brakes barely worked. As the train picked up speed from its descent, Saulin desperately radioed an emergency warning, but failed to identify himself to the controller. He pressed the general alarm button on his radio and left his cab to evacuate the passengers to the rear of the train.

Train 153944 crashed into a delayed outbound train, which was in the midst of evacuating its passengers. The outbound train's driver, André Tanguy, remained in his cab to lead the evacuation effort, repeating a warning over his train's intercom numerous times until he was killed in the collision.

== Investigation ==
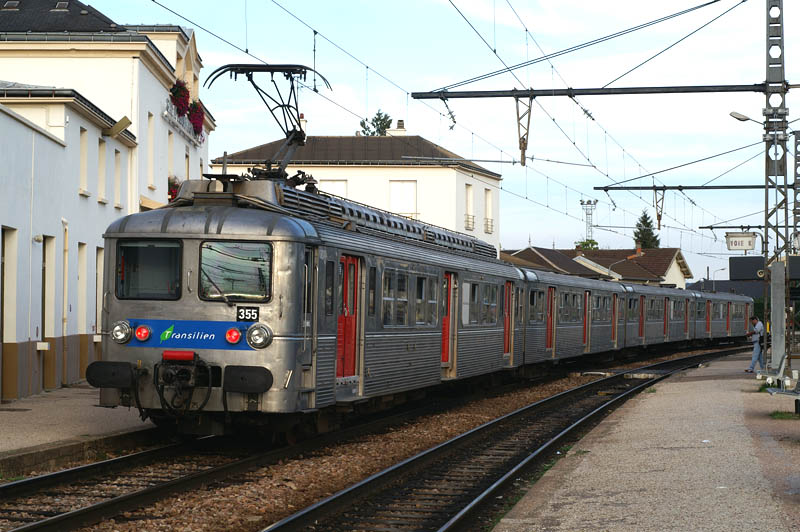
Train similar to that involved in the accident

Initial thoughts were that the collision was the result of a terrorist act, due to a recent string of bombings of French trains in and around Paris. This theory was supported by the fact that investigators who were examining the wrecked shell of train 153944 found the main brake pipe valve, located behind the first car, closed. When open, this valve allows compressed air generated in the first car to travel back through the other cars to power the compressed air brakes. When closed, the brakes on all cars behind the valve are disabled. Despite the signs of possible terrorism, the investigators believed that only someone with detailed knowledge of the braking system's workings could have closed the valve.

Next, whoever pulled the emergency brake was scrutinized, though the person was unknown. When a newspaper printed an advertisement asking for the brake-puller to come forward, a young mother, Odile Mirroir, came forward. She told investigators that she normally used train 153944's stop at the Le Vert de Maisons station to pick up her children from school. However, she was unaware that the new summer timetable meant that her train would not stop at Le Vert de Maisons. So not wanting to keep her children waiting, she pulled the emergency brake and left the train. She was fined 1,000 francs for her action.

The investigators then turned to an older interview with Saulin and looked at the record more closely than before. After the brake was pulled, Saulin went to the rear of the first car to pull the reset handle, but the handle was sluggish and refused to move. Having been overlooked previously, it was discovered that Saulin had placed his hand on the main brake pipe valve to get more leverage to pull the reset handle. When Saulin finally pulled the handle, the investigators surmise, he must have also accidentally closed the valve.

However, this conclusion raised another question as to how Saulin managed to get the train moving again. A fail-safe mechanism on the cars locks the brakes in the on position if the valve is closed. The only way to start the train again is to re-open the valve or manually unlock each brake pad. SNCF policy requires to call for an engineer to examine the train (who would have probably found the closed valve). However, Saulin, anxious to continue the trip, enlisted the help of Bovée to work along opposite sides of the train unlocking each brake. Saulin believed the cause of the problem to be a common condition known as an "air lock". When the emergency brake is activated, an "air lock" is the result of the compressed air filling up the brake pipes, clogging them and preventing the brakes from working. The brake pads lock as part of the fail-safe mechanism when an air lock occurs. To fix this problem, the trapped air must be bled out of the pipe to release the brakes. So with the assistance of Bovée, he went and manually bled what little air was left out of each brake of the carriages. Nevertheless, Saulin had no idea of what he had done, and stated that the pressure gauge in his cab was marking the correct measure, which is why he thought all the braking systems were in working order. Unbeknownst to him, he had closed the main valve, isolating the front carriage from the rest of the train. He had freed the brakes, but had overridden a failsafe mechanism: and with the valve closed, there was no way for new air to come in and replenish the system. Thus the gauge only showed the pressure of the first carriage's brakes.

Even with only one-eighth of the required braking power, there were still opportunities to stop or slow the train. First, there was one more station (Maisons-Alfort), before Gare de Lyon, which would have given the driver plenty of time to slow down or stop the train. However, to avoid throwing other trains at the Gare De Lyon station off schedule, the controllers ordered the driver to pass through Maisons-Alfort and proceed directly to Gare de Lyon. Second, the train was equipped with an additional electric (dynamic) braking system, but according to Saulin, drivers avoided using the dynamic brakes because they were unreliable and had a tendency to skid the wheels when used in conjunction with the air brakes. In any case, Saulin probably had completely forgotten about it as a result of his panic.

Even at this stage, there were still two more opportunities to get the train to stop. Driver Saulin messaged a warning and activated an emergency alarm to signal that his train was in trouble, but he neglected to identify himself or his position to the controllers, and left his cab before anyone could call him back. The controllers knew that the runaway train was one of four trains due to arrive at the station, and they attempted to message all of them to narrow down the possibilities. If they could rule out which trains were not in trouble, they would have been able to identify the train that was in trouble, and get it diverted to Platform 1. However, when Saulin pushed the emergency alarm, it forced all trains on the network to stop wherever they were and wait for instructions. A resulting stream of calls from waylaid drivers inquiring about the stoppage clogged the communication lines between the control room and the trains. As a result, the controllers were never able to identify the runaway train.

Finally, the signallers had also pre-programmed the tracks so that the runaway train would be diverted into Platform 1, which was empty, instead of Platform 2 where the delayed train was. Crashing into an empty platform might have wrecked the train, but with the passengers evacuated into the eighth carriage, casualties would have been avoided. But when Daniel Saulin activated the alarm, the signallers had to turn all signals to red in a process called the "General Closure procedure". This stopped all trains along the lines heading in and out of Gare de Lyon. However, in order to give the signallers full manual control of the entire network, this procedure disabled all pre-programming of routes and allowed the runaway train to go into Platform 2 instead of Platform 1. At this point, the collision was unavoidable.

== Aftermath ==
The runaway train's driver, Daniel Saulin, was released after serving six months of a four-year manslaughter sentence. Jean-Charles Bovée, the runaway train's guard, was also sentenced to the same term on the same charge. Legal proceedings were begun against the Gare de Lyon supervisor, Auguste-Andre Tholence, who failed to evacuate the station, and Mirroir, but were unsuccessful.

SNCF union representatives claimed Saulin was scapegoated; critics of the SNCF blamed the accident on overly tight scheduling, lack of adequate station space and railway mismanagement.

== Media coverage ==
The accident was featured on season 2 of the National Geographic Channel documentary series Seconds From Disaster in the program Paris Train Crash (also known as Runaway Train). The accident was also featured in UK documentary series “Built From Disaster” episode ‘Trains’.

== See also ==
- Lists of rail accidents
