= Brio =

Brio or BRIO may refer to:

- brio, a composer's instruction, meaning "active", "spirited", "alive", or "vigorous"

== Arts, entertainment, and media ==
- Brio (comics), a fictional Marvel Comics cosmic entity, who is one of the Proemial Gods
- Brio (magazine), a magazine from Focus on the Family
- Bree (Narnia) (German: Brio), the titular character in The Horse And His Boy
- Brio (TV channel), a Slovenian TV channel

== Brands and enterprises ==
- Brio (company), a Swedish toymaking company
- Brio (soft drink), a popular brand of Chinotto soft drink, sold mostly in Canada
- Brio, a popular data warehouse reporting tool now owned by Hyperion Solutions
- Bravo Brio Restaurant Group, a restaurant chain in the United States that includes BRIO Tuscan Grille
- Brio Technology (also known as Brio Software), a software company that was taken over by Hyperion Solutions
- Honda Brio, a city car
- HP Brio, a range of desktop PCs

== Other uses ==
- Architecture Brio, an architecture practice based in Mumbai, India
- Bic Brio, Bristish English for the Bic Crystal ballpoint pen (and other generic disposable ballpoint pens)
- Jeanneau Brio, a French sailboat design
- MN Brio typeface
- Sun Metro Brio, the express bus service used in El Paso, Texas
