= Fabio Gattari =

Italian software analyst (born 1958)

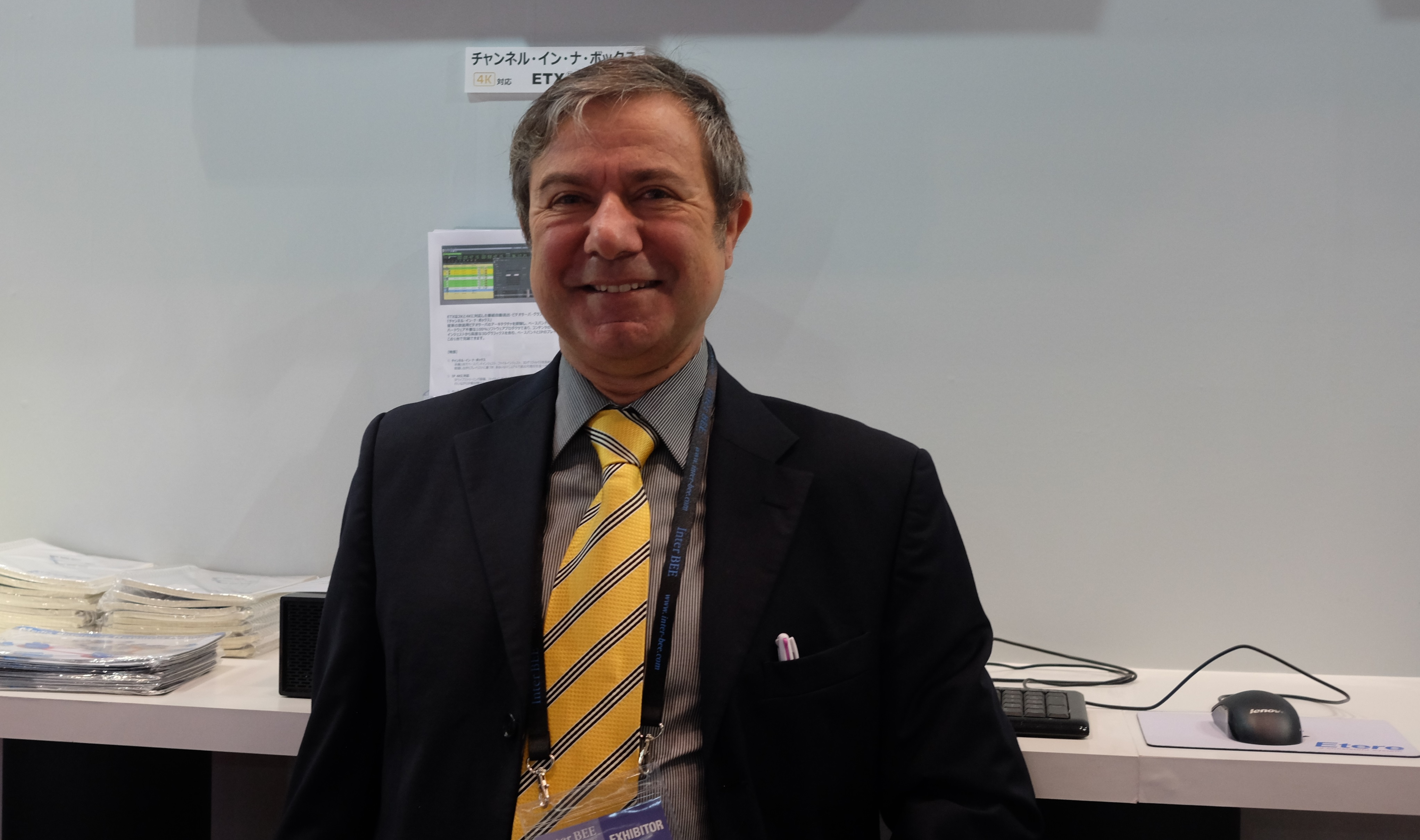
Fabio Gattari in 2016

Fabio Gattari is an Italian software executive. He is the Director of Etere Pte. Ltd., formerly known as SIS (Societa Italiana Software), which he cofounded with Fabio Mazzocchetti in 1987. Etere was the first Italian company to produce television and radio software for scheduling and automation.

== Early life ==
He was born in Tolentino in 1958.

== Career ==
In 1976, Gattari founded the company GB elettronica together with Carlo Barabucci. The company built and supported radio transmitters in the Marche region of Italy.

From 1982 to 1985, Gattari worked with Effe Computers in Macerata, Italy. He became a HP dealer, where he programmed software such as notary office management software (SETA), legal office management software and building site accounting management software. This was one of the first products developed for touch-screens at that time and the HP-150 was one of the first PCs with a built-in touch screen.

Gattari founded SIS (Societa Italiana Software) in 1987 later renaming it Etere. Etere provides media enterprise software for broadcasters and media companies. SIS's first product was SETA. It started with a traffic and billing system for radio stations integrated with a digital playout using a standard PC and an audio card produced by Audiologic. This software was the first to produce a full audio broadcast using a standard PC and audio stored in a networked file server shared using Novell NetWare. SIS maintained an active connection with AER to produce its traffic, billing and scheduling software with documents as requested by Italian broadcasting law.

Gattari led many innovations at Etere including Media Asset Management and Media Enterprise Resources Planning.

Gattari created many innovations, including the first Digital Audio Broadcasting system based on PCs and local network connectivity in 1992. Gattari became a Certified Novell Engineer, in 1993. He became a founding partner of SKYBUS S.R.L which sells satellite digital systems management for Italian radio syndication in 1994.

From 2012, Gattari left Italy and joined Singycon pte ltd as a director. He developed a solution for the media industry in the APAC region and moved to Singapore. In January 2015, Singycon acquired Etere's remaining business after its bankruptcy and moved its headquarters to Singapore under his leadership.

In May 2016, Gattari presented at Asia's international conference for the pro-audio, film and broadcasting industry, BroadcastAsia2016.
