= Kayak (disambiguation) =

A kayak is a personal watercraft.

Kayak may also refer to:

== Places ==
- Kayak Island, in the U.S. state of Alaska
- Kayak Island (Nunavut), Canada

== Other uses ==
- Kayak (band), a Dutch progressive rock band
- Kayak (company), a travel metasearch engine
- HP Kayak, a series of workstations released by Hewlett-Packard from 1997 to 2001
- Kayak PC, a low-cost reference design by Qualcomm
- Kh-35 (AS-20 'Kayak'), a sea skimming, turbojet subsonic cruise, land and ship vessel attack missile designed by Soviet Union
- Fisker Alaska, a cancelled full-size electric pickup truck, known as the Fisker Kayak in Europe.
