= Compaq Evo =

Series of personal computers

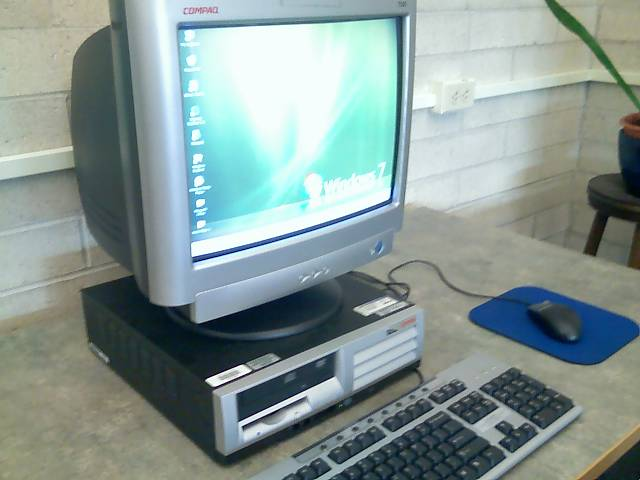
- A Compaq Evo D510 desktop computer
- Developer: Compaq; Hewlett-Packard
- Manufacturer: Compaq; Hewlett-Packard
- Type: Laptop / Desktop / thin client
- Released: 2001–2003
- Discontinued: 2003
- CPU: Intel Pentium III, Intel Pentium 4, Intel Pentium M, Intel Xeon
- Predecessor: 2001 (Compaq): Compaq Armada (notebooks); Compaq Deskpro (desktops); Compaq Professional Workstation (workstations); 2002 (HP acquisition): HP OmniBook (notebooks); HP Vectra (desktops); HP Kayak (workstations)
- Successor: HP Compaq (desktops); HP Compaq (all products)

The Compaq Evo is a series of business high-end PCs (desktop and laptop) and thin clients made by Compaq and then Hewlett-Packard following the 2002 merger. The Evo brand was introduced by Compaq in May 2001 as a business-oriented brand. Considered as Compaq's final flagship family prior to the 2002 merger, it replaced the Deskpro brand of desktops, the Armada brand of notebooks and the Professional Workstation line of workstations. It also replaced the HP OmniBook line of notebooks, the HP Vectra line of desktops and the HP Kayak brand of workstations following the 2002 merger, and in 2003, Evo was discontinued and rebranded as HP Compaq which was used until 2008 for laptops and 2012 for desktops and workstations. It is not to be confused with the later Intel Evo branding for performant laptops.

== Design ==
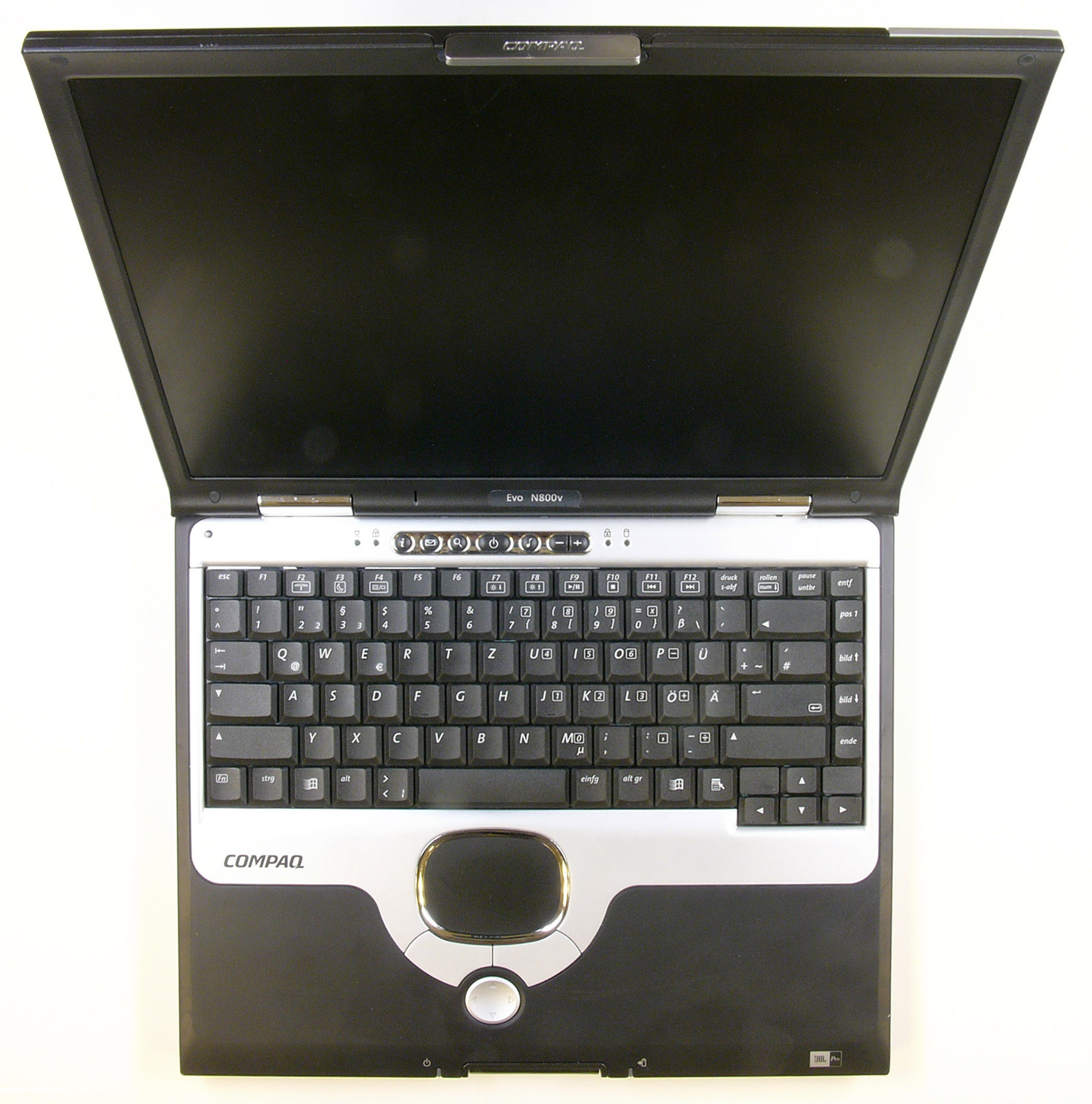
Compaq Evo N800v

The Desktops were small and made to be positioned horizontally instead of vertically so that the monitor could be placed on top to save space. Most featured a sleek silver and black compact design. The early models were shipped with CD-ROM drives but Compaq shipped Evos with CD-RW drives and DVD-ROM drives. The design of some models were only allowed for one CD or DVD drive, but some models had bigger designs for 2 CD or DVD drives. Some models also shipped with a 3½ floppy drive, positioned below the CD or DVD drive. Most models also had 2 USB 2.0 ports in the front for convenience as well as having two in the back for human interface devices and external volumes. Most also had a headphone and microphone jack in the front with a line in and line out in the back.

The laptops were a conservative design, described by one reviewer as "The old-school black, squared-off-corner business notebook". Most models had a tough black case reminiscent of IBM's ThinkPad, a midsize 14" or 15" screen and good multimedia capability.

Most desktops and some laptops were shipped with Pentium 4 processors and some Laptops were shipped with Centrino platforms. The thin clients were based on the Geode processor family.

== Distribution ==
The Compaq Evo was considered a good option for businesses and schools because of its compact and cheap design, as well as having specs suitable for these specific markets. All Compaq Evo computers came shipped with either Windows 2000 or Windows XP preinstalled which can be upgraded to Windows Vista and later to Windows 7.

The last Evo-branded models were released in 2003, and later replaced by re-branded (like other Compaq-branded products) HP Compaq products.

== Models ==
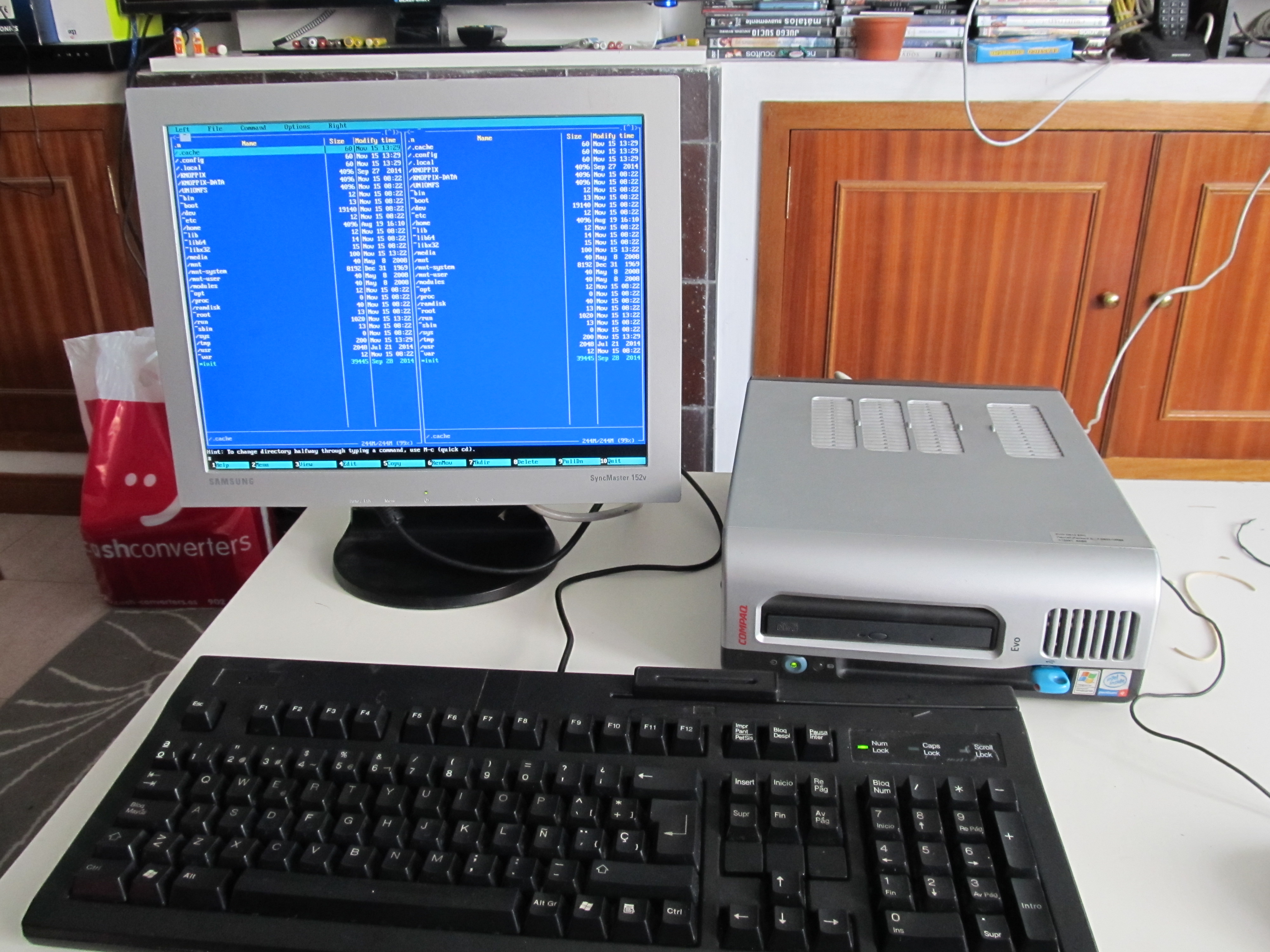
Compaq Evo D510 e-PC with Samsung monitor

=== Desktop models (D and W series) ===
- Compaq Evo D300 series
- Compaq Evo D310 series
- Compaq Evo D311 series
- Compaq Evo D320 series
- Compaq Evo D380 series
- Compaq Evo D381 series
- Compaq Evo D500 series
- Compaq Evo D510 series
- Compaq Evo D520 series
- Compaq Evo W4000 series
- Compaq Evo W6000 series
- Compaq Evo W8000 series

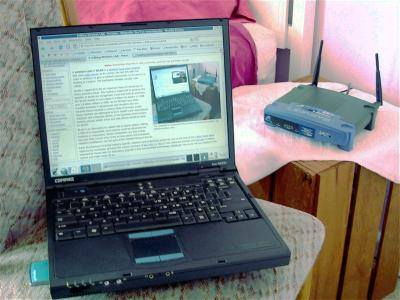
Compaq Evo N610c

=== Notebook models (N series) ===
Compaq Evo laptops
			2001	2002	2003
Main	14"	Intel-based (Pentium III/M)	N600c	N610(c/v)	N620c
Main	12"	Intel-based (Pentium III/M)	N400c	N410c	
Main	10"	Intel-based (Pentium III/M)	N200		
Entry	15"	Intel-based (Pentium 4)		N1000(c/v)	N1020v
Entry	15"	AMD-based		N1005v	N1015v
Entry	15"	Intel-based (Pentium 4)		N800(c/v/w)	
Entry	15"	Intel-based (Pentium III/M)	N180		
Entry	14"	Intel-based (Pentium III/M)	N160		
Entry	14"	Intel-based (Pentium III/M)	N150		
Entry	14"	Intel-based (Pentium III/M)	N110		
"V" - Value version, "W" - workstation.

The Presario-based series laptop (N800 and N1000) uses a desktop-based Pentium 4 CPU.

Known near-clone laptop models:

- Evo N110 - Armada 110
- Evo N400c - Armada M300
- Evo N800 series - Presario 2800
- Evo N1000/N1020 - Presario 1500
- Evo N1005 - Presario 900

The final model to carry the Compaq Evo name was the 14.1" N620c notebook. It was an early Pentium M system which featured up to a 1.6GHz processor and 256 MB RAM as standard but can be upgraded to 2GB by removing the right slot on the palm rest. RAM Source

The N620c was not Intel Centrino-based but instead used a Compaq wireless module that snapped onto the Multiport slot on the lid of the notebook.

=== Thin clients (T series) ===
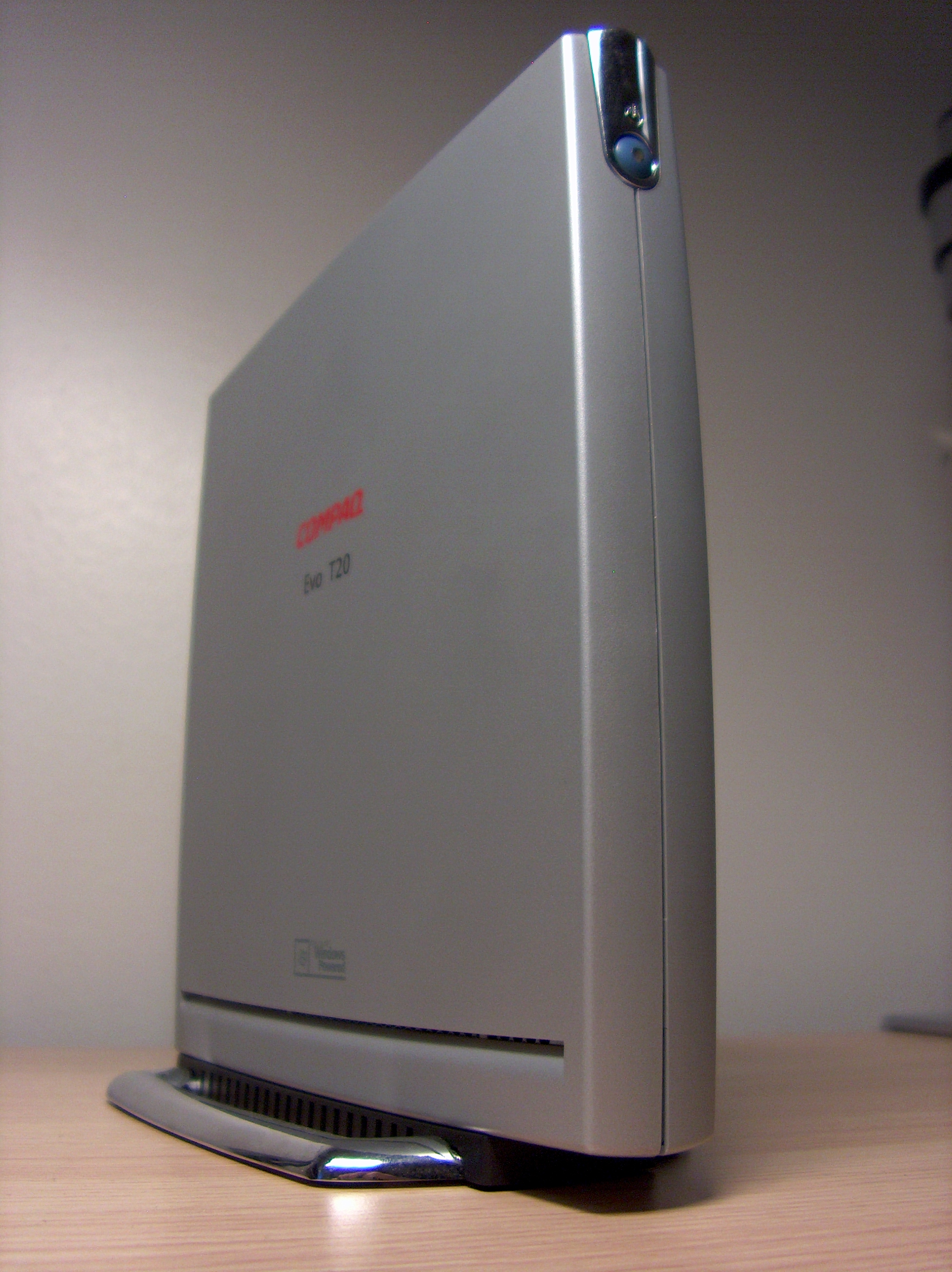
Evo T20

Thin Clients are corporate client devices that allows a user to access a network account located on a server. The vertical orientation enhanced air flow without the need for a fan. Despite its small size, the design provides a distinctive appearance with a high degree of visual impact. They come in two different series.

- Compaq Evo T20 series
- Compaq Evo T30 series

Preceded by Compaq Deskpro desktops Compaq Armada laptops	Compaq Evo; 2001 - 2003	Succeeded by HP Compaq laptops and desktops
