= Compaq Deskpro =

Family of desktop computers

- Developer: Compaq
- Type: Desktop computer
- Released: 1984
- Discontinued: 2002
- CPU: Intel 8086; Intel 80286; i386; i486; Pentium; Pentium II; Pentium III; Pentium 4
- Successor: Compaq Evo

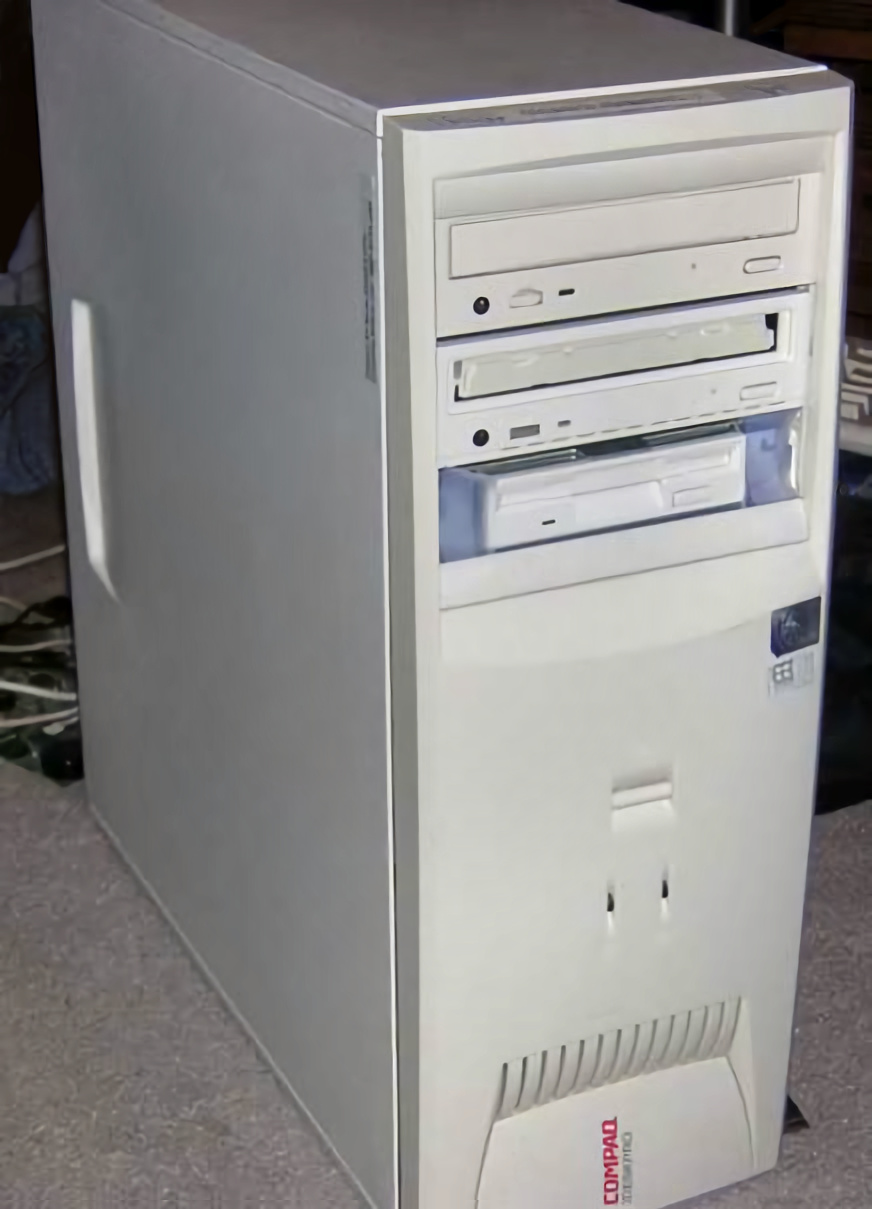
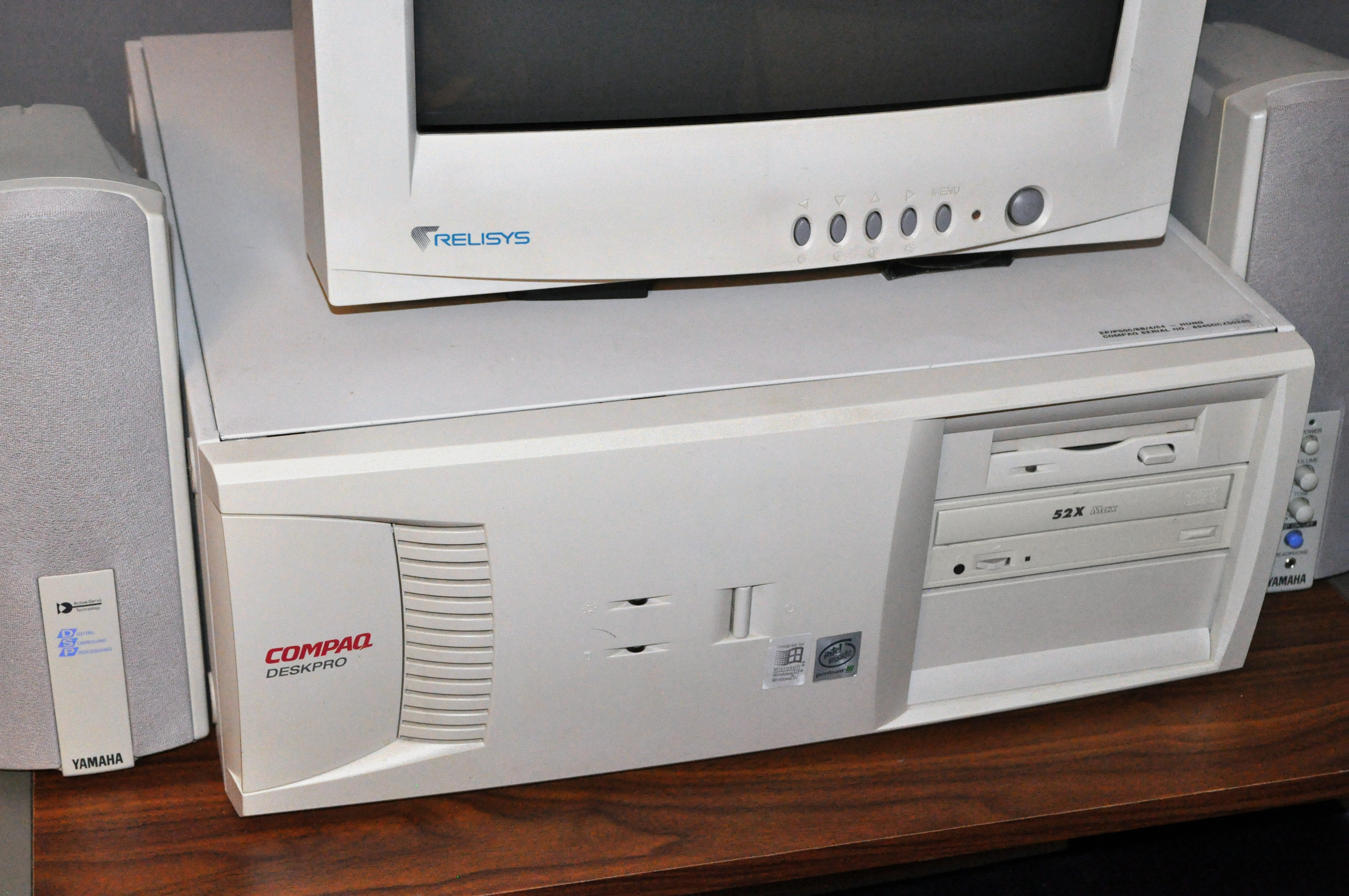
Compaq Deskpro EP PCs from the late 1990s. The case could be converted between tower (left) and desktop form factors.

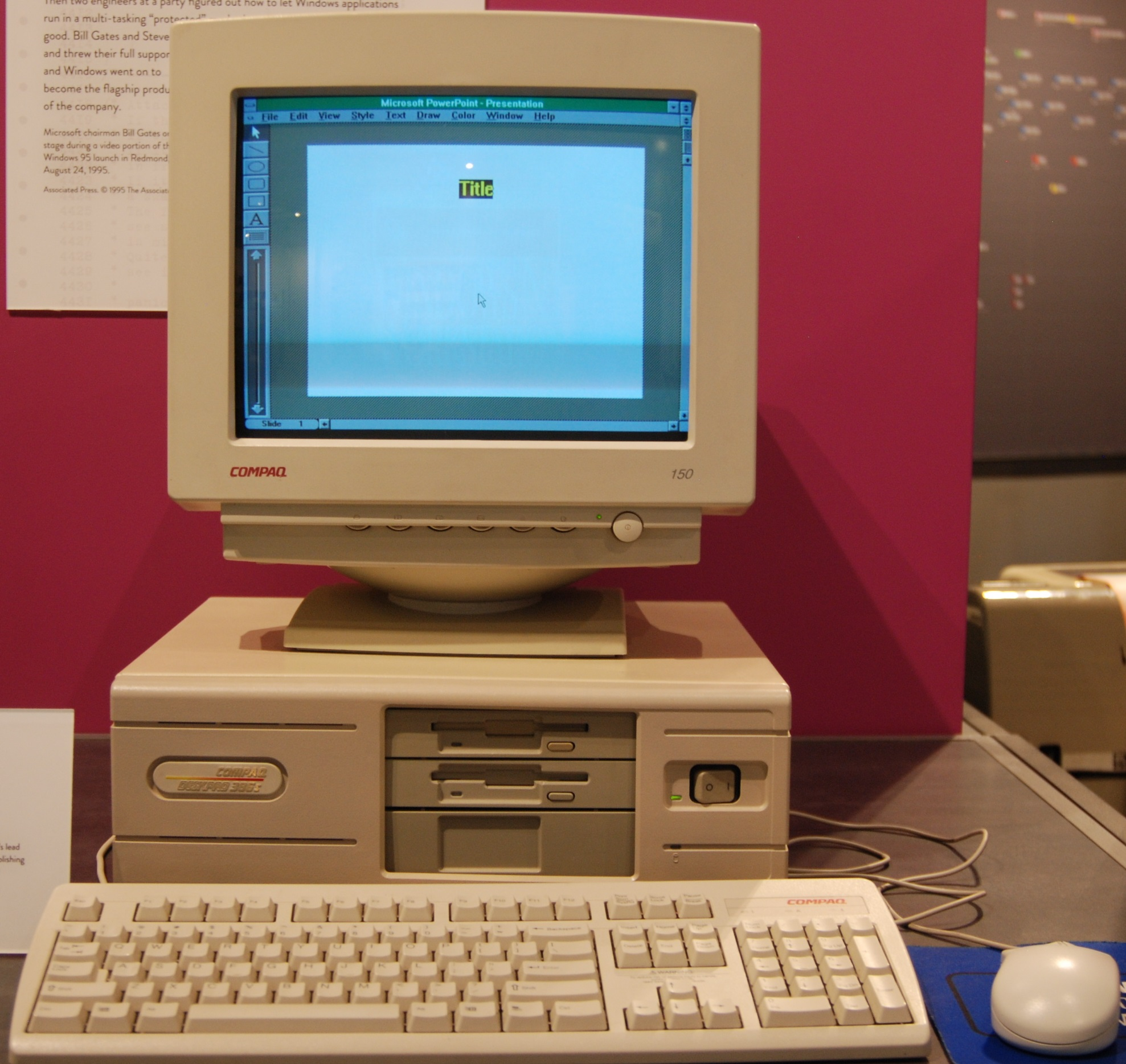
The Compaq DeskPro 386S currently on display at the Living Computer Museum in Seattle, Washington. Microsoft PowerPoint is running on the computer.

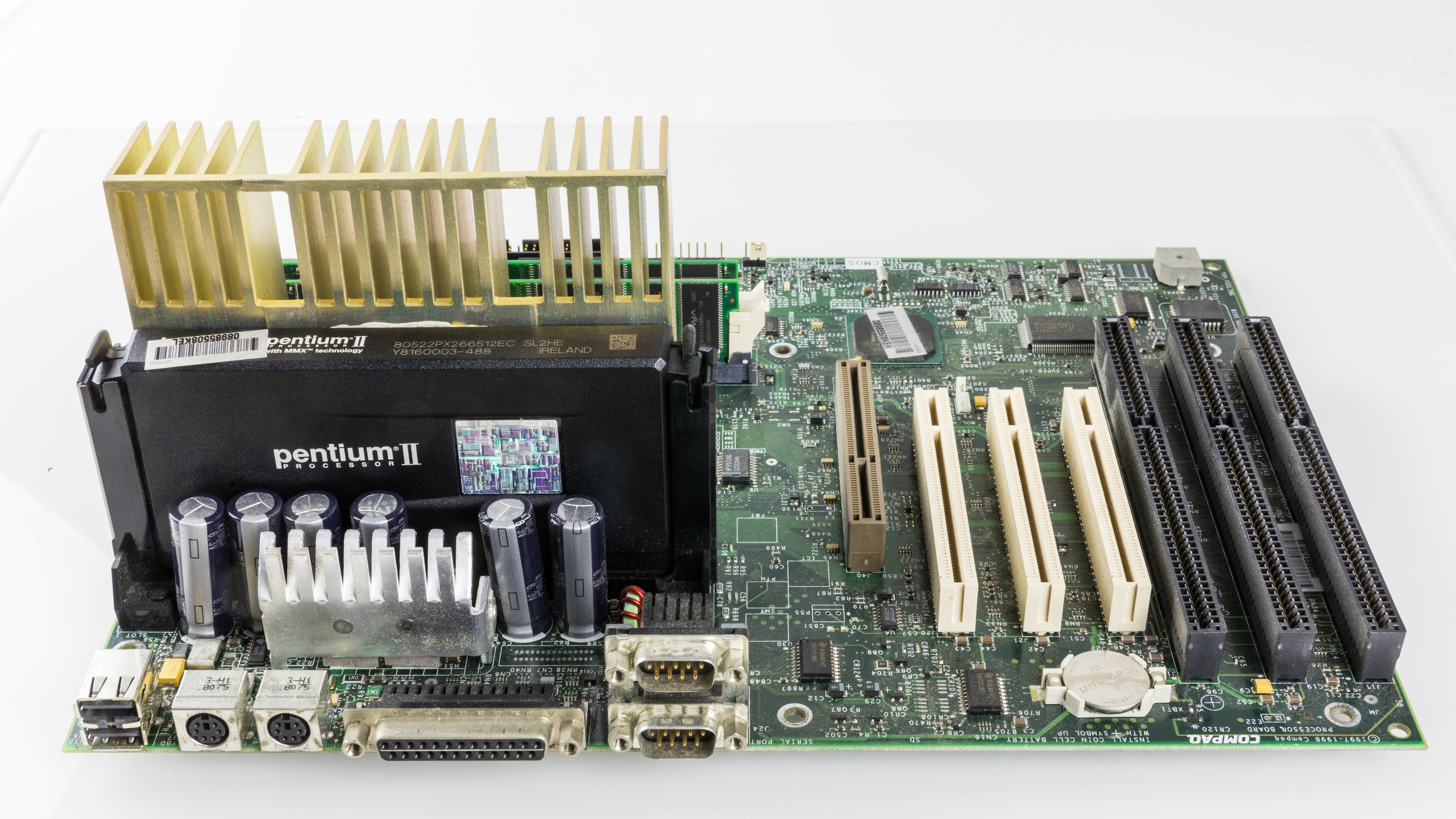
Compaq Deskpro motherboard (1997) with Pentium II processor and three different slot types (AGP for graphics adapter, three PCI and three ISA slots for legacy cards)

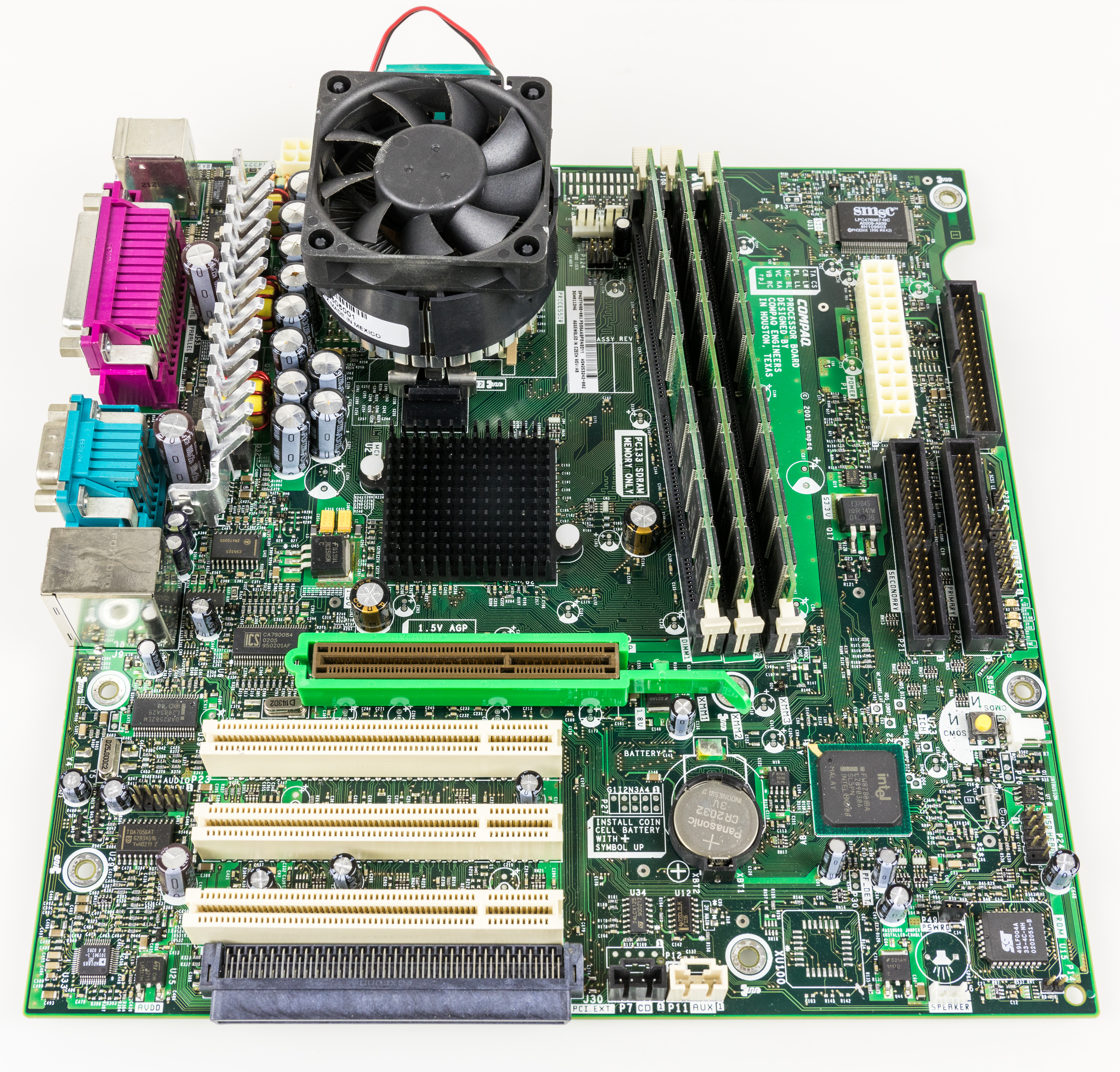
Compaq Deskpro Evo motherboard (2001) with Pentium 4 processor (hidden by cooler fan), three DIMMs, one AGP and three PCI slots

The Compaq Deskpro was manufactured by Compaq as a line of business-oriented desktop computers until replaced by the Evo brand in 2001, with the latter being originally produced up until Compaq merged with HP in 2002, making it (alongside other models at the time) the last computers sold by Compaq prior to the 2002 merger. Models were produced containing microprocessors from the 8086 up to the x86-based Intel Pentium 4. Compaq later merged with Hewlett-Packard in 2002, and subsequently the company began producing computers under the HP ProDesk brand, a product line that is still in use.

== History ==
=== Deskpro (8086) and Deskpro 286 ===
The original Compaq Deskpro (released in 1984), available in several disk configurations, is an XT-class PC equipped with an 8 MHz 8086 CPU and Compaq's unique display hardware that combined Color Graphics Adapter graphics with high resolution Monochrome Display Adapter text. As a result, it was considerably faster than the original IBM PC or XT, and had a much better quality text display compared to IBM PCs which were equipped with either the IBM Monochrome Display Adapter or Color Graphics Adapter cards.

Its hardware and BIOS were claimed to be 100% compatible with the IBM PC, like the earlier Compaq Portable. This compatibility had given Compaq the lead over companies like Columbia Data Products, Dynalogic, Eagle Computer and Corona Data Systems. The latter two companies were threatened by IBM for BIOS copyright infringement, and settled out of court, agreeing to re-implement their BIOS. Compaq used a clean-room design with a reverse-engineered BIOS, avoiding legal jeopardy.

In 1985, Compaq released the Deskpro 286, their clone of the IBM PC/AT.

=== Deskpro 386 ===
In September 1986, the Deskpro 386 was announced after Intel released its 80386 microprocessor, beating IBM by seven months on their comparable 386 computer, thus making a name for themselves. The IBM-made 386DX machine, the IBM PS/2 Model 80, reached the market almost a year later, PC Tech Journal honored the Deskpro 386 with its 1986 Product of the Year award. The Deskpro 386/25 was released in August, 1988 and cost $10,299.

=== Other ===
The form factor for the Compaq Deskpro is mostly the desktop model which lies upon a desk, with a monitor placed on top of it. Compaq has produced many tower upright models that have been highly successful in sales, and are usually convertible to a desktop form factor. An SFF (small form factor) desktop version was also produced during the Deskpro's lifetime. The Deskpro was replaced by the Evo in 2001.

== Models ==
The many different models include the:

- Deskpro 286e
- Deskpro 386: released as the first MS-DOS, PC-compatible 32-bit computer with 386 processor.
- Deskpro 386S: second generation 386 introducing 16-bit bus i386SX processors
- Deskpro XE 486 ISA and IDE
- Deskpro XL: high-end workstation with EISA and SCSI either i486, Pentium or Pentium Pro processors
- Deskpro M: 386, 486 and early Pentium models
- Deskpro 2000: Pentium, Pentium Pro and Pentium II
- Deskpro 4000: Pentium MMX or Pentium II
- Deskpro 6000: Pentium, Pentium Pro or Pentium II and SCSI
- Deskpro DX
- Deskpro EXD, SB, EN, ENL: Pentium III-based
- Deskpro EVO500 series: the last of the range with Pentium 4 processors
- Deskpro Workstation: workstation-class computers
