= HP Brio =

- Developer: Hewlett-Packard
- Manufacturer: Hewlett-Packard
- Type: Desktop personal computer
- Released: September 9, 1997; 28 years ago
- Lifespan: 1998–2002
- Discontinued: 2002
- Operating system: Microsoft Windows
- CPU: Intel x86
- Marketing target: Small business purpose
- Successor: Compaq Evo
- Related: HP Vectra

The HP Brio was a line of business-oriented desktop personal computers made by Hewlett-Packard aimed at small businesses.

== History ==
The Brio was unveiled on September 9, 1997, with the 8000 series, designed for "power-hungry" business users. In September 1998, HP introduced the lower-cost 7000 series, targeted at mainstream business computing, with a starting street price of $2449, inclusive of a 15-inch monitor.

In June 1999, HP announced Brio models BA and BAx that included Microsoft Office 2000 Small Business. They were launched at street prices of $999 and $1,499 respectively.

Announced in October 1999 at an estimated street price of $499, the BA200 was aimed at small businesses that purchase white box PCs—non-branded PCs assembled by resellers or consumer PCs from manufacturers such as eMachines at retail. The PCs came ready for Windows 2000, and were certified for Novell network operating systems, for easy integration into a networked environment. They also shipped with HP Brio Internet Center and HP Brio Center, which together provided comprehensive Internet and e-commerce capabilities and online support.

Alongside HP's announcement of a new HP Brio Business PC line with the HP Brio Internet Center, HP also announced an agreement with AT&T; WorldNet Service to provide small- and medium-business customers with fast, easy access to the Internet. The alliance with AT&T was meant to provide small and medium businesses with an end-to-end solution—from initial connection to creating a Web site and online store.

In 1998, HP partnered with Symantec to incorporate pcANYWHERE32, a remote-control software package, on all HP Brio PCs for small and medium companies without an information technology (IT) staff.

Geared for small business users, the value lines of Brio PCs offered on-screen and online tech support. The latter came via a customized Yahoo! web site that featured news, business tips, stock reports, and product-specific service and support content from HP.

In May 2000, the HP Brio BA200 placed sixth on PC World's May list of Top 10 Budget PCs.

In January 2002, Netscape Communications announced that it had licensed its Netcenter Web portal to Hewlett-Packard for the Brio line of business computers.

== Models ==
The following is a list of all HP Brio models ever launched. "x" in the following names is a variable for models 71–85.

- HP Brio 71xx
- HP Brio 80xx
- HP Brio 81xx
- HP Brio 82xx
- HP Brio 83xx
- HP Brio 84xx
- HP Brio 85xx
- HP Brio BA200
- HP Brio BA210
- HP Brio BA400
- HP Brio BA410
- HP Brio BA600
- HP Brio BAx
- HP Brio BA
- HP Brio BA300
