= Jeanneau Love Love =

Sailboat class

Development
- Designer: Philippe Harlé
- Location: France
- Year: 1971
- No. built: 780
- Builder: Jeanneau
- Role: Cruiser
- Name: Jeanneau Love Love

Boat
- Displacement: 2,650 lb (1,202 kg)
- Draft: 3.40 ft (1.04 m)

Hull
- Type: monohull
- Construction: fiberglass
- LOA: 21.70 ft (6.61 m)
- LWL: 18.50 ft (5.64 m)
- Beam: 8.00 ft (2.44 m)
- Engine: outboard motor

Hull appendages
- Keel: fin keel
- Ballast: 1,040 lb (472 kg)
- Rudder: skeg-mounted rudder

Rig
- Rig type: Bermuda rig

Sails
- Sailplan: masthead sloop
- Mainsail area: 118 sq ft (11.0 m^{2})
- Jib/genoa area: 91 sq ft (8.5 m^{2})
- Spinnaker area: 323 sq ft (30.0 m^{2})
- Other sails: storm jib: 43 sq ft (4.0 m^{2}) genoa: 151 sq ft (14.0 m^{2})
- Upwind sail area: 269 sq ft (25.0 m^{2})
- Downwind sail area: 441 sq ft (41.0 m^{2})

The Jeanneau Love Love is a French trailerable sailboat that was designed by Philippe Harlé as a coastal cruiser and first built in 1971.

The design was developed into the raised deck Jeanneau Brio in 1979.

== Production ==
The design was built by Jeanneau in France, from 1971 until 1979, with 780 boats completed, but it is now out of production.

== Design ==
The Love Love is a recreational keelboat, built predominantly of fiberglass, with wood trim. It has a masthead sloop rig, with a deck-stepped mast, one set of straight spreaders and aluminum spars with stainless steel wire rigging. The hull has a raked stem, a slightly reverse transom, a skeg-mounted rudder controlled by a tiller and a fixed swept fin keel. It displaces 2,650 lb (1,202 kg) and carries 1,040 lb (472 kg) of ballast.

The boat has a draft of 3.40 ft (1.04 m) with the standard keel.

The boat is normally fitted with a small outboard motor for docking and maneuvering.

The design has sleeping accommodation for four people, with a double "V"-berth in the bow cabin and two straight settee berths in the main cabin. The galley is located on the starboard side just forward of the companionway ladder and slides aft under the cockpit when not in use. The galley is equipped with a single-burner stove and a sink. The head is located just aft of the bow cabin on the port side and includes a shower. There are two heads, one just aft of the bow cabin on the port side and one on the starboard side in the aft cabin. Cabin headroom is 59 in (150 cm).

For sailing downwind the design may be equipped with a symmetrical spinnaker of 323 sq ft (30.0 m^{2}).

The design has a hull speed of 5.77 kn (10.69 km/h).

== See also ==
- List of sailing boat types
