= HP Kayak =

Line of workstation computers

Kayak

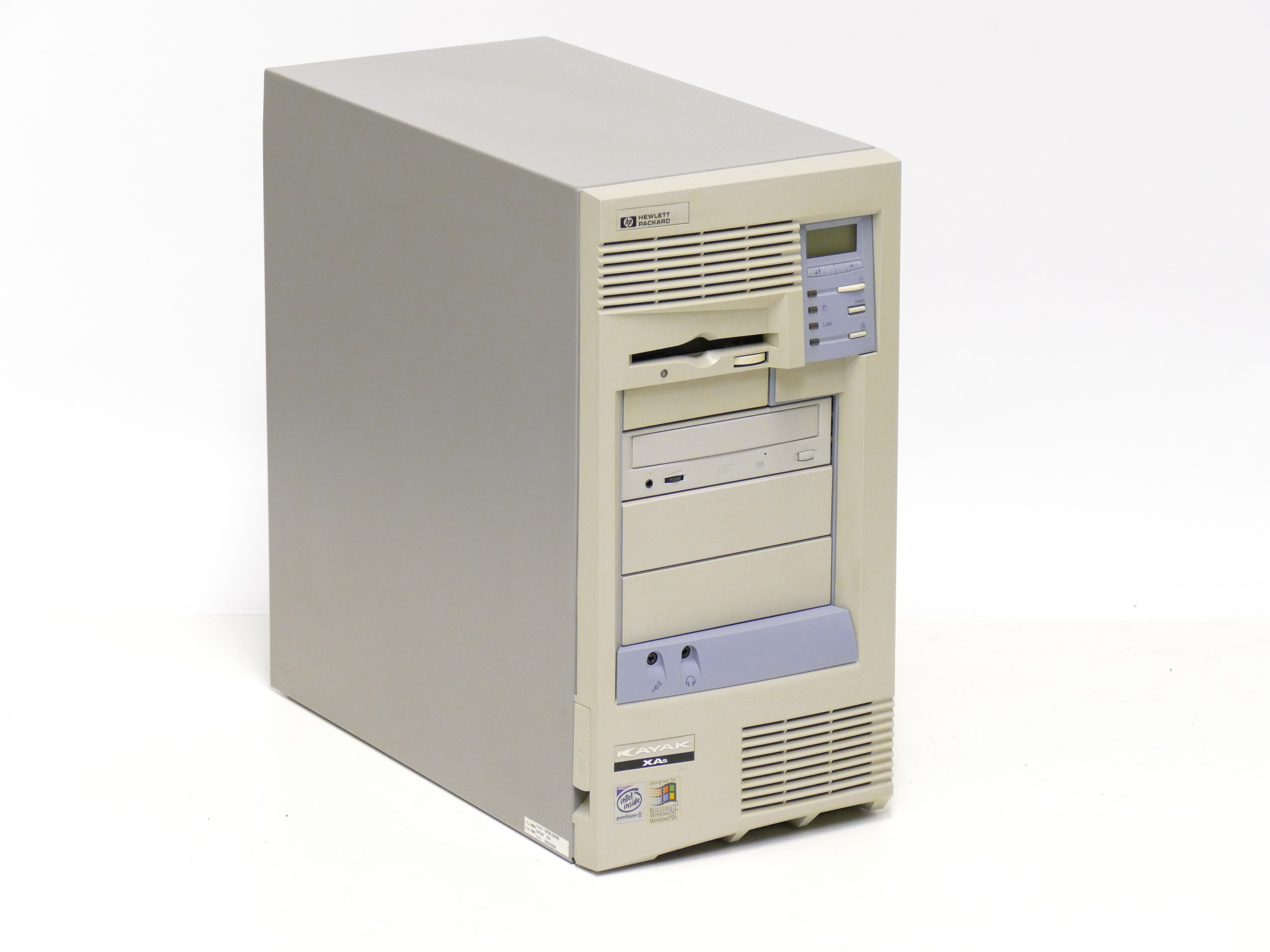
- HP Kayak XAs, dual Pentium II workstation
- Developer: Hewlett-Packard
- Type: Workstation
- Released: September 9, 1997
- Discontinued: 2002
- Operating system: Windows NT
- CPU: Pentium II; Pentium II Xeon; Pentium III; Pentium III Xeon; Pentium 4

Kayak was a line of x86-based, optionally dual-processor workstation computers released by Hewlett-Packard from 1997 until the acquisition of Compaq in 2002. The Kayak line was aimed at the scientific computing and professional 3D graphics markets and came preinstalled with Windows NT.

== History ==
Hewlett-Packard introduced the Kayak line on September 9, 1997, alongside their Brio line of small office/home office desktops. Models in the Kayak line initially featured Intel's Pentium II processors; later models featured Pentium II Xeons, Pentium IIIs, Pentium III Xeons, and Pentium 4s. The Kayak line was introduced expressly to compete with Compaq, then the largest global manufacturer of personal computers, in the scientific computing and professional 3D graphics markets—particularly with Compaq's Professional Workstation line. The Kayak served as HP's introduction to the Wintel workstation market; they had previously only catered to the Unix set with their RISC-based 9000 line of performance workstations.

HP came to dominate the Wintel workstation segment with the Kayak by the turn of the millennium. However, in late 2001, they were eclipsed by Dell and their Precision workstations. In Europe, HP rebranded the Kayak as the HP Workstation with their x4000 model in 2001. By 2002, HP followed suit in the United States.
