= Sun Metro Brio =

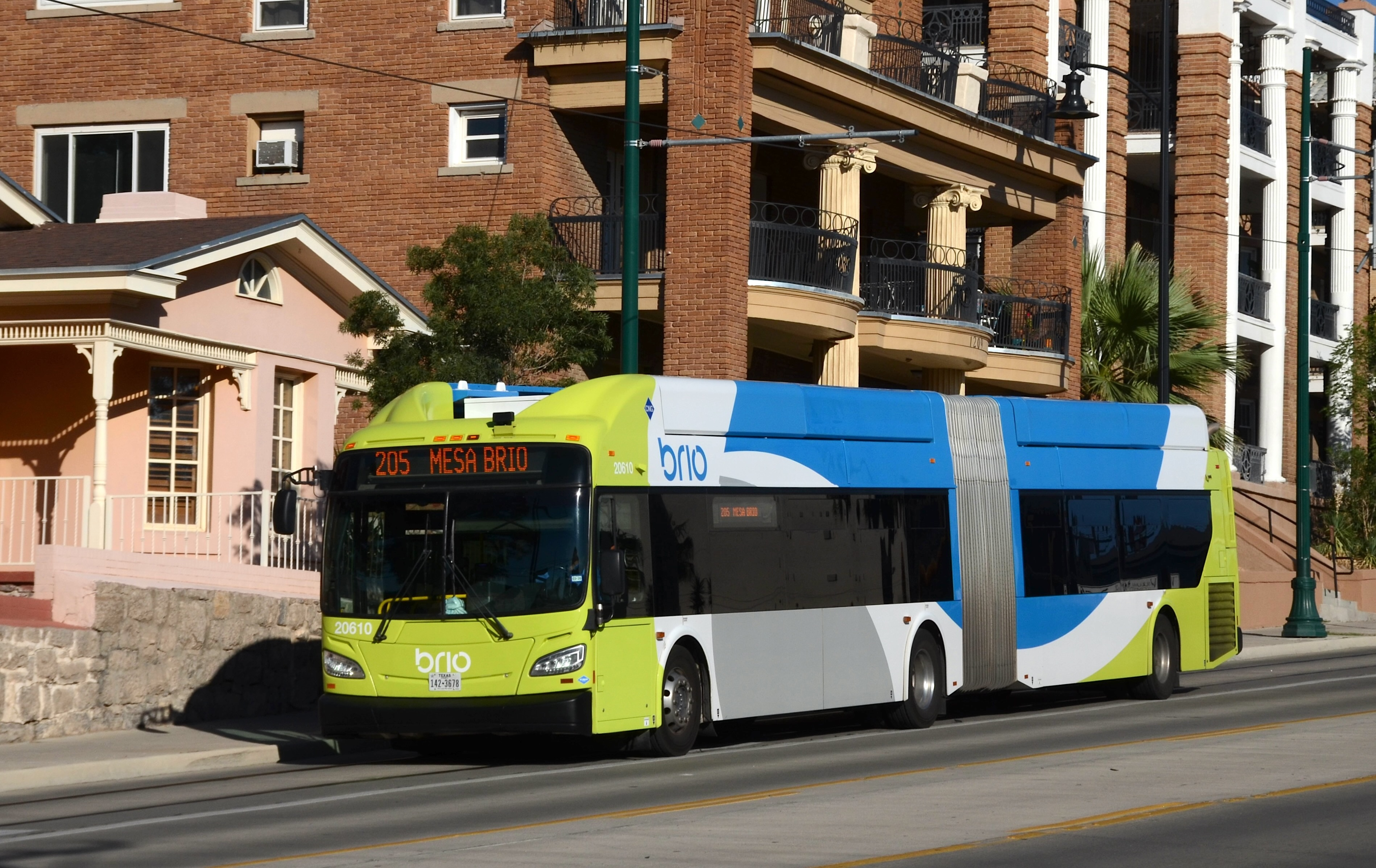
- A Brio bus on Oregon Street in 2025

Overview
- Operator: Sun Metro
- Vehicle: New Flyer Xcelsior XN60
- Status: Operational
- Began service: October 27, 2014

Route
- Route type: Bus rapid transit
- Locale: El Paso
- Length: 51.3 miles (82.6 km)
- Stations: 98

Service
- Frequency: 10–15 minutes
- Weekend frequency: 20 minutes on Saturdays; 25 minutes on Sundays
Route map
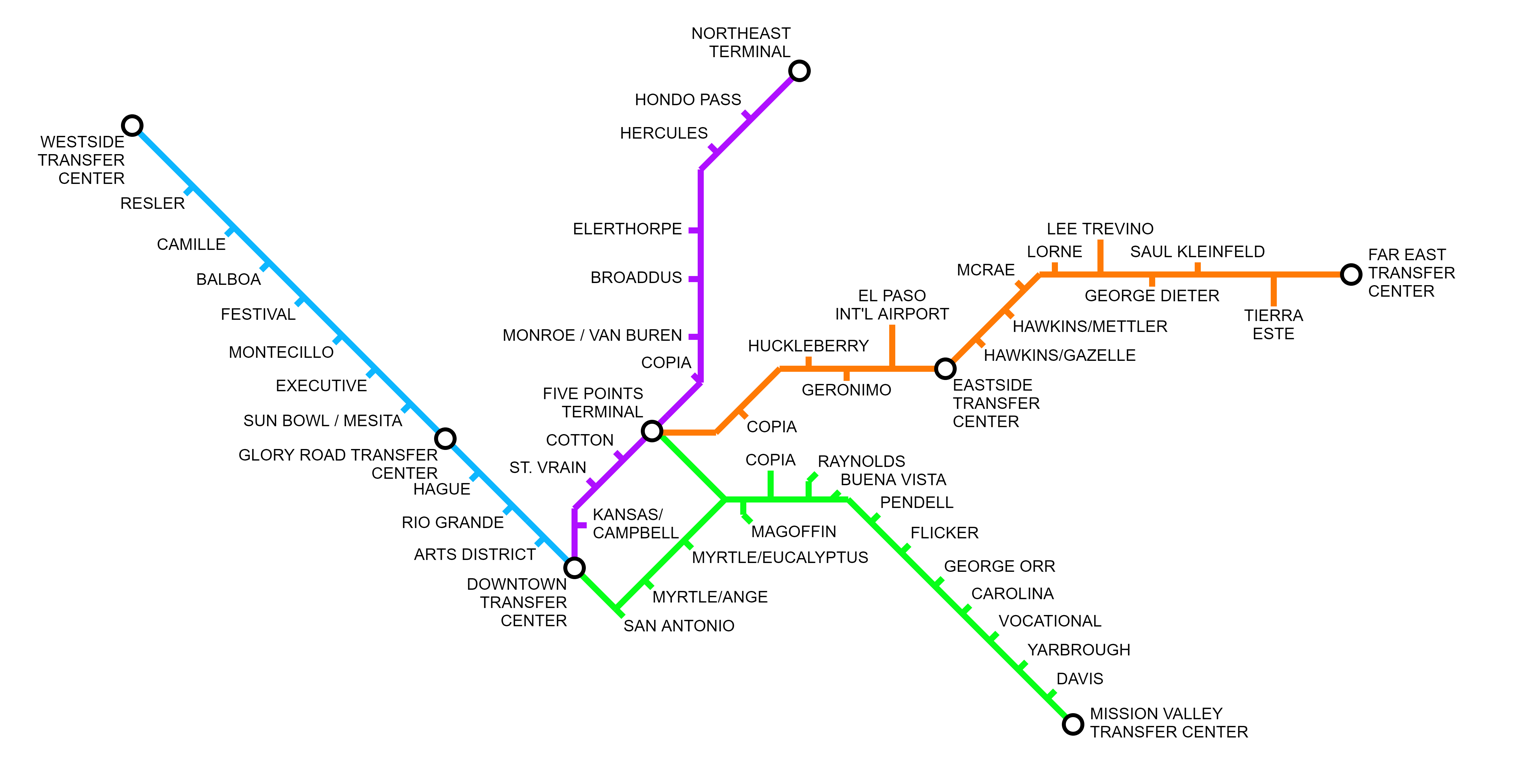

Brio is a bus rapid transit system in El Paso, Texas, United States. It is operated by Sun Metro.

The first line, the Mesa Corridor, began operating in the fall of 2014. This line is 8.6 miles (13.8 km) long and uses 22 purpose-built curbside stations with shelters, ticket vending machines for pre-boarding payment, and real-time arrival information. Two more corridors, Dyer (Northeast) and Alameda (Mission Valley) Corridors became operational in October 2018. The Montana Corridor, which serves the Eastside, opened on November 6, 2022.

== Description ==
Each Brio corridor contains at least two transfer centers, where passengers can transfer between Brio and local buses. Outside of transfer centers, stops consist of curbside shelters with the following amenities:

- Free WiFi
- Translucent panels for better lighting
- Bike racks
- Shade screens
- Electronic real-time displays
- Ticket vending machine (TVM)
- Solar-powered compacting trash can
- Displays of unique public artwork

The Brio fleet consists of 60-foot-long (18 m) branded New Flyer Xcelsior articulated buses powered by compressed natural gas, able to carry 72 total passengers and feature on-board WiFi, interior bike racks, and passenger information monitors. Each bus also contains three doors to facilitate a quicker boarding process.

The vehicles operate in mixed traffic. Signal prioritization is used to lengthen green traffic signals and reduce delays. The frequency of Brio buses range from 10 minutes during weekday rush hours to 15 minutes mid-day from Monday to Friday, 20 minutes on Saturdays and 25 minutes on Sundays. Stations are located about a mile apart. Passengers can buy a one-way trip, a day pass, a weekly pass or a monthly pass from the ticket vending machine located at all permanent Brio stations. To prevent fare evasion, Brio Ambassadors will be monitoring and requesting proof of payment during trips on Brio.

Over 50,000 people use Brio every month, which has meant that approximately 20 tonnes of carbon dioxide was not emitted in the first year of its operation. Brio has also inspired new businesses; around 20 have been launched since Brio was launched as of 2016.

== Naming the system ==
Sun Metro hired PAVLOV, a marketing communications company, to develop the system name and logo. The word Brio is Spanish for excitement, verve and energy.

The logo was designed to complement the circular nature of Sun Metro's current logo. The ‘b’ and ‘o’ in Brio are a graphic element that can be used to extend the identity of the RTS system. The movement within the logotype references the wheels on the vehicles. In addition to the name and logo, Sun Metro selected a color palette and graphic standards to make Brio stations and buses distinctive and easily recognizable.

== Fares ==
Fares for Brio are the same as standard fare on other Sun Metro lines. Currently, the standard fare is $1.50, $1.00 for students, and $0.30 for seniors 65+, disabled and Medicare. Sun Metro also offers daily, weekly, and monthly passes for each fare category.

== Lines ==
=== Mesa Corridor ===
- Length: about 8.6 miles (13.8 km)
- Beginning of route: Downtown Transfer Center
- End of route: Westside Transfer Center
- Total number of buses: 10
- Number of stations: 22
- Total project cost: $27.1 million
- FTA funding: $15.6 million
- TXDOT funding: $5.5 million
- Operational: currently operational

=== Alameda Corridor ===
- Length: 14.5 miles (23.3 km)
- Beginning of route: Downtown Transfer Center
- End of route: Mission Valley Transfer Center
- Total number of buses: 14
- Number of stations: 29
- Total construction project cost: $38.3 million
- Funding: 100 percent City of El Paso
- Operational: currently operational

=== Dyer Corridor ===
- Length: 11.4 miles (18.3 km)
- Beginning of route: Downtown Transfer Center
- End of route: Northeast Transfer Center
- Total number of buses: 10
- Number of stations: 22
- Total project cost: $35.9 million
- FTA funding (anticipated): $21.7 million
- TXDOT funding: $6.6 million
- Operational: currently operational

=== Montana Corridor ===
- Length: 16.8 miles (27.0 km)
- Beginning of route: Five Points Terminal
- End of route: Future Far East Side Transfer Center
- Total no. of buses: 14
- Number of stations: 25
- Total project cost: $47 million
- FTA funding (anticipated): $29.5 million
- TXDOT funding: $8 million
- Operational: currently operational

== 2025 maintenance facility explosion ==
On February 11, 2025, bus 20602, a New Flyer Xcelsior CNG powered articulated bus, fell from a hydraulic lift, puncturing the fuel tank and exploding. 48 fire units and over 100 firefighters were dispatched to handle the fire. Two workers were killed, and 11 others were injured. The building sustained major damage, with parts of the roof and walls collapsed. Four buses surrounding 20602 in the facility were also destroyed by the fire, and eight other buses sustained some damage.

Sun Metro publicly released the surveillance camera footage of the explosion in October 2025.
