= HP-150 =

1980s computer made by Hewlett-Packard

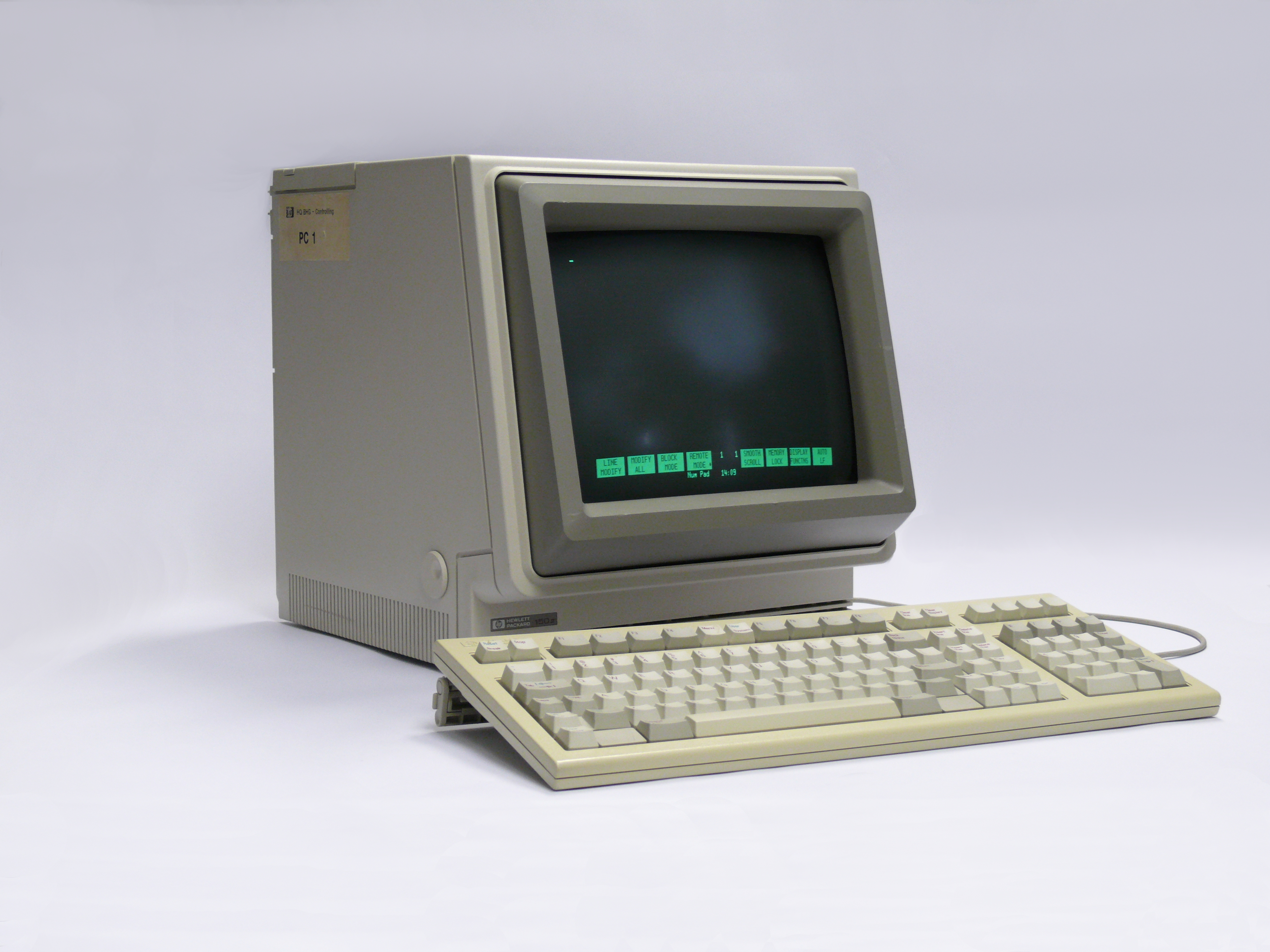
- HP 150-II
- Manufacturer: Hewlett-Packard Company (HP)
- Type: A single-unit touchscreen personal computer
- Released: November 28, 1983; 42 years ago
- Introductory price: $2795 MSRP
- Discontinued: Yes
- Media: Two 270 KB floppy drives
- Operating system: MS-DOS or CP/M-86
- CPU: Intel 8088 @ 8 MHz
- Memory: 256 KB RAM, 160 KB ROM (DRAM)
- Display: Built-in 9" Sony CRT • Text: 80 columns, 27 lines • Bitmap: 512 × 390 pixels
- Graphics: 6 KB SRAM (video)
- Input: • Infrared emitters and detectors for touchscreen functionality • Keyboard
- Connectivity: • Two RS-232 ports, with one supporting RS-422 • One 8-bit parallel multi-master interface bus: HP-IB, IEEE-488 standard

HP-150 (aka HP Touchscreen or HP 45611A) was a compact, powerful and innovative computer made by Hewlett-Packard and introduced in Las Vegas at Comdex fall trade show on November 28,1983. It was based on the Intel 8088 CPU and was one of the world's earliest commercialized touch screen computers. Like other "workalike" IBM PC clones of the time, despite running customized MS-DOS versions 2.01, 2.11 and 3.20, the machine was not IBM PC DOS compatible. Its 8088 CPU, rated at 8 MHz, was faster than the 4.77 MHz CPUs used by the IBM PC of that period. Using add-on cards, main memory could be increased from 256 KB to 640 KB. However, its mainboard did not have a slot for the optional Intel 8087 math coprocessor due to space constraints. An HP-150 with an optional hard disk was called HP Touchscreen MAX.

The computer's screen was a 9-inch Sony CRT surrounded by infrared emitters and detectors which detected the position of any non-transparent object that touched the screen. In the original HP-150, these emitters and detectors were placed within small holes located on the inside of the monitor's bezel (which resulted in the bottom series of holes sometimes filling with dust, causing the touchscreen to fail until the dust was vacuumed from the holes).

Like the original Macintosh, HP-150 was packaged with the CRT display as a single unit, and made use of 3½-inch floppy disks. Unlike the Mac, however, HP-150 had no internal floppy drive; the machine sat atop the phone book-sized 9121D dual 3½-inch floppy (76 mm high, 325 mm wide, 285 mm deep) or similarly sized hard disk devices, connected by HP-IB.

Invisible to the user, the HP-150 runs "Terminal Operating System" ("TOS", code-named "Magic" during development). This operating system generally runs only two tasks: the terminal emulator and MST (which is Microsoft DOS).

== Hardware ==
=== Display ===
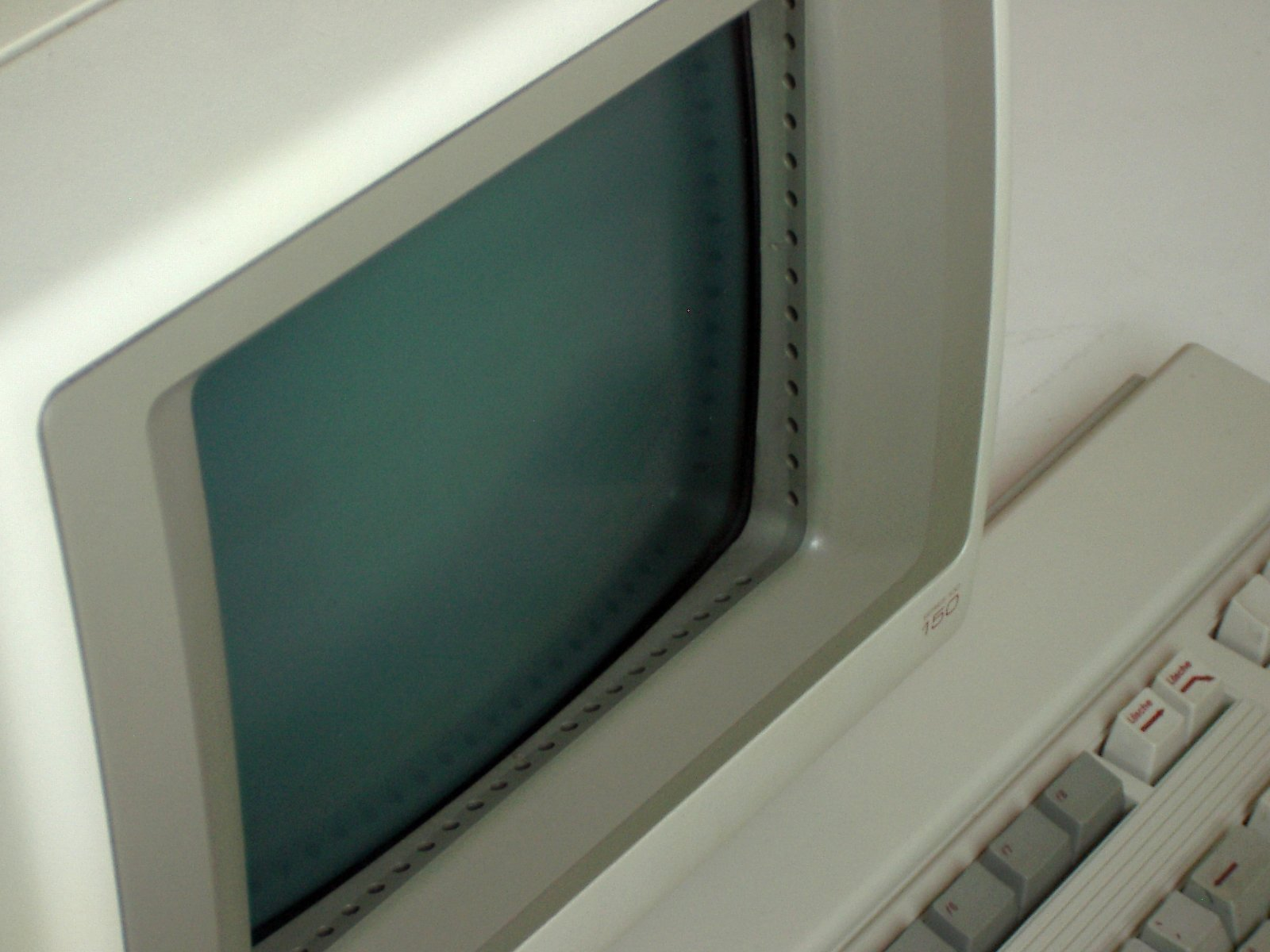
HP-150 touchscreen

Display resolutions:

- Text: 80 columns × 27 lines (720 × 378 pixels)
  - Character size: 7 × 10 pixels
  - Character cell size: 9 × 14 pixels
  - Inherent HP Terminal emulation equivalent to HP 2623 Graphics Terminal
- Bit-map: 512 × 390 pixels
- Separate plane for text and graphics
- Monitor sensor grid: 40 (h) × 24 (v)

HP-150's touch screen sensor grid is quite coarse. Its resolution is only two characters wide. Used mainly for rough cursor positioning and function key control, it could not be used to draw pictures.

=== Processor unit ===
- Optional internal thermal printer HP 2647A (fax roll)
- Communication ports:
  - Two RS-232 ports (one of them supported RS-422)
  - HP-IB (IEEE-488)
  - HP-HIL (standard on HP-150 II, but an optional add-on card on HP-150)

=== Storage ===
- Supported HP-IB attached storage:

HP Model	Command Set	# FDD	FDD type	Sides	FDD capacity (each)	# HDD	HDD capacity	Notes
HP 82901M	Amigo	2	5.25"	DS	270 KB	0	—N/a	Add-on only
HP 82902M	Amigo	1	5.25"	DS	270 KB	0	—N/a	Add-on only
HP 9121D	Amigo	2	3.5"	SS	270 KB	0	—N/a	—
HP 9121S	Amigo	1	3.5"	SS	270 KB	0	—N/a	Add-on only
HP 9122D	SS/80	2	3.5"	DS	710 KB	0	—N/a	—
HP 9122S	SS/80	1	3.5"	DS	710 KB	0	—N/a	Add-on only
HP 9123D	SS/80	2	3.5"	DS	710 KB	0	—N/a	HP-150 II only
HP 9125S	Amigo	1	5.25"	DS	360 KB	0	—N/a	Add-on only. Not bootable
HP 9127S	Amigo	1	5.25"	DS	360 KB	0	—N/a	Add-on only. Not bootable
HP 9133A	Amigo	1	3.5"	SS	270 KB	1	5 MB	—
HP 9133B	Amigo	1	3.5"	SS	270 KB	1	10 MB	—
HP 9133D	SS/80	1	3.5"	DS	710 KB	1	15 MB	—
HP 9133H	SS/80	1	3.5"	DS	710 KB	1	20 MB	Requires DOS 3.20
HP 9133L	SS/80	1	3.5"	DS	710 KB	1	40 MB	Requires DOS 3.20
HP 9133V	Amigo	1	3.5"	SS	270 KB	1	5 MB	—
HP 9133XV	Amigo	1	3.5"	SS	270 KB	1	15 MB	—
HP 9134A	Amigo	0	—N/a	—N/a	—N/a	1	5 MB	—
HP 9134B	Amigo	0	—N/a	—N/a	—N/a	1	10 MB	—
HP 9134H	SS/80	0	—N/a	—N/a	—N/a	1	20 MB	Requires DOS 3.20
HP 9134L	SS/80	0	—N/a	—N/a	—N/a	1	40 MB	Requires DOS 3.20
HP 9134V	Amigo	0	—N/a	—N/a	—N/a	1	5 MB	—
HP 9134XV	Amigo	0	—N/a	—N/a	—N/a	1	15 MB	—
HP 9153A	SS/80	1	3.5"	DS	710 KB	1	10 MB	—
HP 9153B	SS/80	1	3.5"	DS	710 KB	1	20 MB	Requires DOS 3.20
HP 9153C	SS/80	1	3.5"	DS	710 KB	1	10/20/40 MB	Requires DOS 3.20
HP 9154A	SS/80	0	—N/a	—N/a	—N/a	1	10 MB	—
HP 9154B	SS/80	0	—N/a	—N/a	—N/a	1	20 MB	Requires DOS 3.20

== Reception ==
BYTE in November 1984 called HP-150 "an extremely flexible machine", but "difficult to program".

== Software ==
The HP-150 hosted some of the earliest PC games, including the classic role-playing game Temple of Apshai and the InfoCom games Zork-1, Witness and Enchanter. As a business machine, Lotus 1-2-3, WordStar, DBase and Multiplan were available.

There are 24 known commercial games for HP 150.

Title	Year	Publisher	Reference
Adventure: The Original		Hewlett-Packard	
Baron: The Real Estate Simulation	1984	Blue Chip Software	
Cyborg	1984	Hewlett-Packard	
Deadline		Infocom	
Enchanter		Infocom	
Infidel		Infocom	
Milky Way Merchant		Blythe Valley Software	
Millionaire: The Stock Market Simulation	1984	Blue Chip Software	
Planetfall		Infocom	
Ricochet		Epyx	
Sargon III	1984	Hayden Software	
Seastalker		Infocom	
Sorcerer		Infocom	
Starcross	1984	Infocom	
Suspended	1984	Infocom	
Temple of Apshai		Epyx	
The Witness	1984	Infocom	
Touch Games I	1984	Hewlett-Packard	
Tycoon: The Commodity Market Simulation	1984	Blue Chip Software	
Type Attack	1983	Sirius Software	
Winning Deal	1984	Hewlett-Packard	
Zork I	1984	Infocom	
Zork II		Infocom	
Zork III	1984	Infocom	

== Successors ==
The two-CPU HP-120 (aka HP 45600A) Z80 CP/M machine also used the 9121 drives.

HP-150 II (aka HP 45849A) replaced HP-150 in 1984. While still called HP Touchscreen II, the touchscreen was no longer standard, but rather a rarely adopted option. The optional touchscreen bezel was superior to the original bezel, in that the emitters and detectors were now located behind a solid infrared-transparent plastic; thus removing the need to regularly clean the holes found in the original model.

HP-150 II had the same footprint as HP-150, but came in a larger housing to accommodate its 12-inch screen, but could no longer accommodate an internal printer. HP-150 II had four expansion slots available (as opposed to two), and could accommodate an optional 8087 co-processor board. There were some minor compatibility problems between HP-150 and HP-150 II in the video subsystem.

In 1985, HP introduced the Vectra, which InfoWorld stated was the company "responding to demands from its customers for full IBM PC compatibility". HP repositioned HP-150 as a workstation for the HP 3000 minicomputer.

== See also ==
- List of Hewlett-Packard products
- HP Roman-8

== Bibliography ==
- HP 150 Personal Computer. Series 100. Hewlett Packard. September 1983. 5953-5846.
- Dolan, Richard P., ed. (August 1984). "HP 150 issue" (PDF). Hewlett-Packard Journal. 35 (8).
- HP 150 Technical Reference Manual (PDF). HP 150 Personal Computers. Hewlett Packard. April 1984. 45625-90001.
- Lemmons, Phil; Robertson, Barbara (October 1983). "Product Preview: The HP 150". BYTE. Vol. 8, no. 10. pp. 36–50.
- Lemmons, Phil; Robertson, Barbara (October 1983). "An Interview: The HP 150's Design-team Leaders". BYTE. Vol. 8, no. 10. pp. 51–58.
- The Definitive HP150 Catalog. The 1991 Edition. Personalized Software
