= List of HP business desktops =

Desktop computer brand

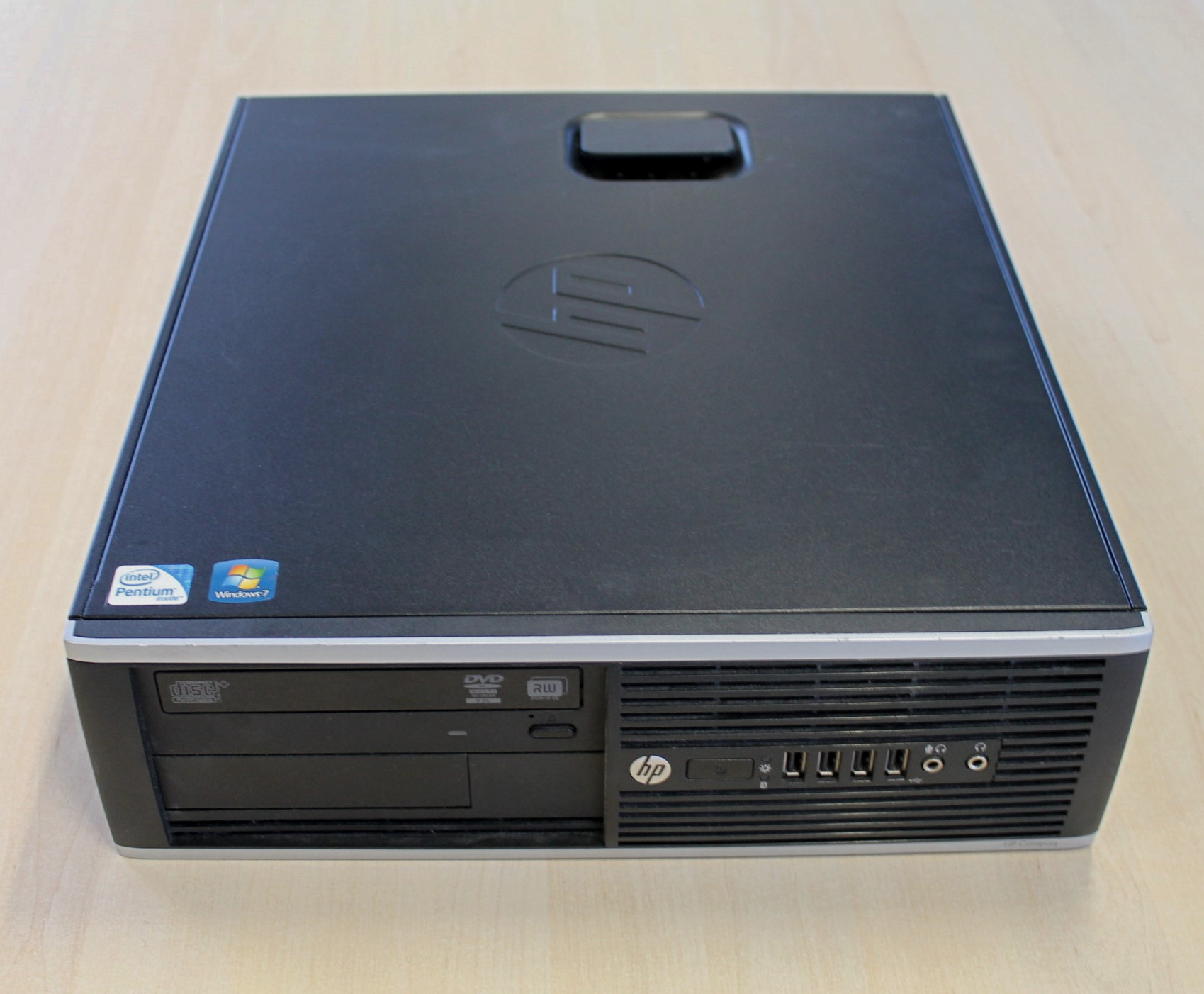
HP Compaq Elite 8000 small form factor desktop

HP Inc. targets their line of business desktop computers for use in the corporate, government, and education markets. HP operate their business desktops on minimum 12-month product cycle. Their product line mainly competes with Dell OptiPlex, Acer Veriton, and Lenovo ThinkCentre.

HP's market share for their business line of desktops in 2010 was estimated to be 18.7 percent in 2022.

HP's business desktops are available as number of brand names including HP Business, HP Pro, HP Elite. Previously, they were available as HP Compaq from the Compaq merger and the rebranding of the Evo series of business desktops and laptops to the aforementioned name in 2003 up until the Compaq brand name was discontinued by HP in 2013.

== Models ==
=== Pro series (entry-level) ===
HP's entry-level business desktops typically include two memory slots, as opposed to four in the higher-tier ranges, thus limiting the maximum amount of RAM that can be installed. Units typically use lower-tier motherboards with cheaper and less-feature-rich chipsets.

In tables below, the Chassis column occasionally uses prefixal:
C = Convertible... and
US = Ultra-slim...
along with the following acronyms:
AIO = All-in-One
DM = Desktop Mini
DT = Desktop
MT = Minitower
SFF = Small Form Factor
ST = Slim Tower
TWR = Tower

Model	Chipset	CPU	Platform	GPU		RAM		Chassis	Released
Model	Chipset	CPU	Platform	Integrated	Discrete	Type	Max	Chassis	Released
HP dx1000	Intel G31	Intel Core 2	LGA 775	Intel GMA 3100	ATI Radeon HD 2400 XT ATI Radeon HD 4650	DDR2, 2	4 GB	MT	2009
HP dx2000	Intel 865GV	Intel Pentium 4	Socket 478	Intel Extreme Graphics 2	No GPU slot	DDR, 4	4 GB	MT	2004
HP dx2009	VIA CN700/800(?)	VIA C7-D	BGA	VIA UniChrome	No GPU slot	DDR2, 2	2 GB	USFF	2006
HP dx2040	VIA CN896	VIA C7-D	BGA	VIA Chrome 9 HC	ATI Radeon HD 3450	DDR2, 2	4 GB	MT	2007
HP dx2080	Intel 945GZ	Intel Core 2, Pentium D, Pentium 4	LGA 775	Intel GMA 950	No GPU slot	DDR2, 2	4 GB	MT	2006
HP dx2100	Intel 915GV	Intel Pentium 4	LGA 775	Intel GMA 900	No GPU slot	DDR2, 4	4 GB	MT	2005
HP dx2150	ATI Radeon Xpress 200	AMD Athlon 64 X2, Athlon 64, Sempron	Socket 939	ATI Radeon Xpress 200		DDR, 4	4 GB	MT	2005
HP dx2200	ATI Radeon Xpress 200	Intel Pentium D, Pentium 4	LGA 775	ATI Radeon Xpress 200	ATI Radeon X300 SE ATI Radeon X1300	DDR2, 2	2 GB	SFF, MT	2006
HP dx2250	ATI Radeon Xpress 1150	AMD Athlon 64 X2, Athlon 64, Sempron	Socket AM2	ATI Radeon Xpress 1150	ATI Radeon X1300	DDR2, 2	4 GB	MT	2007
HP dx2280	Intel 945G	Intel Core 2, Pentium D, Pentium 4	LGA 775	Intel GMA 950		DDR2, 4	4 GB	MT	
HP dx2300	Intel 946GZ	Intel Core 2, Pentium D, Pentium 4	LGA 775	Intel GMA 3000	ATI Radeon X1300 ATI Radeon X1300 Pro	DDR2, 2	4 GB	MT	2007
HP dx2390	Intel G31	Intel Core 2	LGA 775	Intel GMA 3100	Nvidia GeForce 8400 GS ATI Radeon HD 2400 XT	DDR2, 2	4 GB	MT	2007
HP dx2400	Intel G33	Intel Core 2	LGA 775	Intel GMA 3100	Nvidia GeForce 8400 GS ATI Radeon HD 2400 XT	DDR2, 4	8 GB	MT	2007
HP dx2450	Nvidia nForce 430	AMD Athlon 64 X2, Athlon 64, AMD Phenom	Socket AM2	Nvidia GeForce 6150 SE	Nvidia GeForce 8400 GS ATI Radeon HD 2400 XT	DDR2, 2	4 GB	MT	2008
HP dx2480	Intel G33	Intel Core 2	LGA 775	Intel GMA 3100	Nvidia GeForce 8400 GS ATI Radeon HD 2400 XT	DDR2, 4	8 GB	MT	2008
HP dx2700	Intel Q963	Intel Core 2, Pentium D, Pentium 4	LGA 775	Intel GMA 3000	No GPU slot	DDR2, 4	8 GB	SFF, MT	2006
HP dx2708	Intel Q963	Intel Core 2, Pentium D, Pentium 4	LGA 775	Intel GMA 3000		DDR2, 4	8GB		2006
HP dx2810	Intel G45	Intel Core 2	LGA 775	Intel GMA X4500HD	ATI Radeon HD 2400 XT ATI Radeon HD 3450 ATI Radeon HD 3470 ATI Radeon HD 3650 (MT only) ATI Radeon HD 4650 (MT only)	DDR2, 4	8 GB	SFF, MT	2008
HP Pro 3000	Intel G45	Intel Core 2	LGA 775	Intel GMA X4500HD	Nvidia GeForce 210 ATI Radeon HD 4350 ATI Radeon HD 4550 ATI Radeon HD 4650	DDR3, 4	16 GB	SFF, MT	2009
HP Pro 3005	Nvidia GeForce 9100	AMD Phenom II, Athlon 2, Sempron	Socket AM3	Nvidia GeForce 9100	Nvidia GeForce 210 ATI Radeon HD 4350 ATI Radeon HD 4550 ATI Radeon HD 4650	DDR3, 4	16 GB	MT	2010
HP Pro 3010	Intel G43/G45	Intel Core 2	LGA 775	Intel GMA X4500HD	Nvidia GeForce 210 Nvidia GeForce GT 230 ATI Radeon HD 4350 ATI Radeon HD 4550 ATI Radeon HD 4650	DDR3, 4	16 GB	SFF, MT	Q1 2010
HP Pro 3015	Nvidia GeForce 9100	AMD Phenom II, Athlon 2, Sempron	Socket AM3	Nvidia GeForce 9100	Nvidia GeForce 210 Nvidia GeForce GT 230 ATI Radeon HD 4350 ATI Radeon HD 4550 ATI Radeon HD 4650	DDR3, 4	16 GB	MT	2010
HP Pro 3085	Nvidia GeForce 9100	AMD Phenom II, Athlon 2, Sempron	Socket AM3	Nvidia GeForce 9100		DDR3, 4	16 GB		2010
HP Pro 3115	AMD 760G	AMD Phenom II, Athlon 2, Sempron	Socket AM3	ATI Radeon HD 3100	GeForce 210 GeForce GT 220 GeForce GT 230 GeForce GT 315 ATI Radeon HD 4350 ATI Radeon HD 4550 ATI Radeon HD 4650 ATI Radeon HD 5450 ATI Radeon HD 5570	DDR3, 4	16 GB	MT	2010
HP Pro 3120	Intel G43	Intel Core 2	LGA 775	Intel GMA X4500	GeForce 210 GeForce GT 220 GeForce GT 230 GeForce GT 315 GeForce GT 320 ATI Radeon HD 4350 ATI Radeon HD 4550 ATI Radeon HD 4650 ATI Radeon HD 5450 ATI Radeon HD 5570	DDR3, 4	16 GB	MT	2010
HP Pro 3125	AMD 760G	AMD Phenom II, Athlon 2, Sempron	Socket AM3	ATI Radeon HD 3100	GeForce 210 GeForce GT 220 GeForce GT 230 GeForce GT 315 GeForce GT 320 ATI Radeon HD 4550 ATI Radeon HD 4650 ATI Radeon HD 5450 ATI Radeon HD 5570	DDR3, 4	16 GB	MT	2010
HP Pro 3130	Intel H57	Intel 1st gen. (Nehalem) Core 'i'	LGA 1156	Intel HD Graphics (i3 5xx/i5 6xx only)	GeForce 210 GeForce GT 220 GeForce GT 230 GeForce GT 315 ATI Radeon HD 4550 ATI Radeon HD 4650 ATI Radeon HD 5450 ATI Radeon HD 5570	DDR3, 4	16 GB	MT	2010
HP Pro 3300	Intel H61	Intel 2nd gen. (Sandy Bridge) Core 'i'	LGA 1155	Intel HD 2000/3000	Nvidia GeForce 405 Nvidia GeForce GT 420 Nvidia GeForce GT 440 Nvidia GeForce GT 520 Nvidia GeForce GT 530 Nvidia GeForce GT 545 AMD Radeon HD 6450 AMD Radeon HD 6570	DDR3, 2	16 GB	SFF, MT	2011
HP Pro 3305	AMD 785G	AMD Phenom II, Athlon 2, Sempron	Socket FM1	ATI Radeon HD 4200	Nvidia GeForce 405 Nvidia GeForce GT 420 Nvidia GeForce GT 440 Nvidia GeForce GT 520 Nvidia GeForce GT 530 Nvidia GeForce GT 545 AMD Radeon HD 6450 AMD Radeon HD 6570	DDR3, 4	16 GB	SFF, MT	2011
HP Pro 3400	Intel H61	Intel 2nd gen. (Sandy Bridge) Core 'i'	LGA 1155	Intel HD 2000/3000	No GPU slot	DDR3, 2	16 GB	MT	2011
HP Pro 3405	AMD A55	AMD A series (Llano)	Socket FM1	AMD Radeon HD 6xx0D	No GPU slot	DDR3, 2	16 GB	MT	2011
HP Pro 3410	Intel H61	Intel 2nd gen. (Sandy Bridge) Core 'i'	LGA 1155	Intel HD 2000/3000	GeForce 405 GeForce GT 520 GeForce GT 530 AMD Radeon HD 6350 AMD Radeon HD 6450	DDR3, 2	16 GB	SFF, MT	2011
HP Pro 3415	AMD A55	AMD A series (Llano)	Socket FM1	AMD Radeon HD 6xx0D	GeForce 405 GeForce GT 520 GeForce GT 530 AMD Radeon HD 6350 AMD Radeon HD 6450	DDR3, 2	16 GB	MT	2011
HP Pro 3500	Intel H61	Intel 2nd gen. (Sandy Bridge) Core 'i' Intel 3rd gen. (Ivy Bridge) Core 'i'	LGA 1155	Intel HD 2000/3000 Intel HD 2500/4000	GeForce 405 GeForce GT 520 GeForce GT 530 GeForce GT 620 GeForce GT 630 GeForce GT 640 AMD Radeon HD 6350 AMD Radeon HD 6450 AMD Radeon HD 7350 AMD Radeon HD 7450 AMD Radeon HD 7570	DDR3, 2	16 GB	MT	2011
HP Pro 3505	AMD A55	AMD A series (Llano)	Socket FM1	AMD Radeon HD 6xx0D	GeForce 405 GeForce GT 520 GeForce GT 530 GeForce GT 620 GeForce GT 630 GeForce GT 640 AMD Radeon HD 6350 AMD Radeon HD 6450 AMD Radeon HD 7350 AMD Radeon HD 7450 AMD Radeon HD 7570	DDR3, 2	16 GB	MT	2011
HP Pro 3515	AMD A75	AMD A series (Llano)	Socket FM1	AMD Radeon HD 6xx0D	GeForce 405 GeForce GT 520 GeForce GT 530 GeForce GT 620 GeForce GT 630 GeForce GT 640 AMD Radeon HD 6350 AMD Radeon HD 6450 AMD Radeon HD 7350 AMD Radeon HD 7450 AMD Radeon HD 7570	DDR3, 4	16GB	MT	2011
HP Compaq 4000 Pro	Intel B43	Intel Core 2	LGA 775	Intel GMA X4500	Nvidia Quadro NVS 300 Nvidia Quadro NVS 310 ATI Radeon HD 4550 AMD Radeon HD 6350 AMD Radeon HD 6450	DDR3, 2	8 GB	SFF	Q1 2011
HP Compaq 4300 Pro	Intel H61	Intel 2nd gen. (Sandy Bridge) Core 'i' Intel 3rd gen. (Ivy Bridge) Core 'i'	LGA 1155	Intel HD 2000/3000 Intel HD 2500/4000	Nvidia Quadro NVS 300 Nvidia Quadro NVS 310 AMD Radeon HD 6350 AMD Radeon HD 7450	DDR3, 2	16 GB	SFF	Q2 2012
HP ProDesk 400 G1	Intel H81	Intel 4th gen. (Haswell) Core 'i'	LGA 1150	Intel HD 4400/4600	Nvidia Quadro NVS 310 Nvidia Quadro NVS 315 Nvidia GeForce GT 630 (MT only) AMD Radeon HD 8350 AMD Radeon HD 8470 (MT only) AMD Radeon HD 8490	DDR3, 2	16 GB	SFF, MT	Q4 2013
HP ProDesk 400 G1	Intel H87 (490 G1)	Intel 4th gen. (Haswell) Core 'i'	LGA 1150	Intel HD 4400/4600	Nvidia Quadro NVS 310 Nvidia Quadro NVS 315 Nvidia GeForce GT 630 (MT only) AMD Radeon HD 8350 AMD Radeon HD 8470 (MT only) AMD Radeon HD 8490	DDR3, 4	32 GB	MT	Q4 2013
HP ProDesk 400 G1	Intel H81	Intel 4th gen. (Haswell) Core 'i'	LGA 1150	Intel HD 4400/4600	No GPU slot	DDR3, 2	16 GB	DM	Q4 2013
HP ProOne 400 G1	Intel H81	Intel 4th gen. (Haswell) Core 'i'	LGA 1150	Intel HD 4400/4600	No GPU slot	DDR3, 2	16 GB	AiO	Q4 2013
HP ProDesk 400 G2	Intel H81	Intel 4th gen. (Haswell) Core 'i'	LGA 1150	Intel HD 4400/4600	Nvidia Quadro NVS 310 Nvidia Quadro NVS 315 Nvidia GeForce GT 630 (MT only) AMD Radeon HD 8350 AMD Radeon HD 8470 (MT only) AMD Radeon HD 8490 AMD Radeon R7 240 AMD Radeon R7 255	DDR3, 2	16 GB	SFF, MT	Q4 2014
HP ProDesk 400 G2	Intel H110	Intel 6th gen. (Skylake) Core 'i'	LGA 1151	Intel HD 510/530	No GPU slot	DDR4, 2	32 GB	DM	Q4 2015
HP ProOne 400 G2	Intel H110	Intel 6th gen. (Skylake) Core 'i'	LGA 1151	Intel HD 510/530	No GPU slot	DDR4, 2	32 GB	AiO	Q4 2015
HP ProDesk 400 G3	Intel H110	Intel 6th gen. (Skylake) Core 'i' Intel 7th gen. (Kaby Lake) Core 'i'	LGA 1151	Intel HD 510/530 Intel HD 610/630	Nvidia GeForce GT 720 (MT only) Nvidia GeForce GT 730 AMD Radeon R9 350 (MT only)	DDR4, 2	32 GB	SFF, MT, DM	Q4 2015
HP ProDesk 400 G3	Intel H170 (490 G3)	Intel 6th gen. (Skylake) Core 'i' Intel 7th gen. (Kaby Lake) Core 'i'	LGA 1151	Intel HD 510/530 Intel HD 610/630	Nvidia GeForce GT 720 (MT only) Nvidia GeForce GT 730 AMD Radeon R9 350 (MT only)	DDR4, 4	64 GB	MT	Q1 2017
HP ProDesk 400 G3	Intel H270	Intel 6th gen. (Skylake) Core 'i' Intel 7th gen. (Kaby Lake) Core 'i'	LGA 1151	Intel HD 510/530 Intel HD 610/630	No GPU slot	DDR4, 2	64 GB	DM	Q1 2017
HP ProOne 400 G3	Intel H270	Intel 6th gen. (Skylake) Core 'i' Intel 7th gen. (Kaby Lake) Core 'i'	LGA 1151	Intel HD 510/530 Intel HD 610/630	No GPU slot	DDR4, 2	64 GB	AiO	Q1 2017
HP ProDesk 400 G4	Intel H270	Intel 6th gen. (Skylake) Core 'i' Intel 7th gen. (Kaby Lake) Core 'i'	LGA 1151	Intel HD 510/530 Intel HD 610/630	Nvidia GeForce GT 730 AMD Radeon R7 430 AMD Radeon R7 450 AMD Radeon RX 460 AMD Radeon 520 AMD Radeon 535 AMD Radeon RX 550 AMD Radeon RX 550X	DDR4, 2	64 GB	SFF, MT	Q1 2017
HP ProDesk 400 G4	Intel H270	Intel 8th gen. (Coffee Lake) Core 'i'	LGA 1151v2	Intel UHD 610/630	No GPU slot	DDR4, 2	64 GB	DM	Q2 2018
HP ProOne 400 G4	Intel Q370	Intel 8th gen. (Coffee Lake) Core 'i'	LGA 1151v2	Intel UHD 610/630	AMD Radeon 535	DDR4, 2		AiO	Q2 2018
HP ProDesk 400 G5	Intel B360	Intel 8th gen. (Coffee Lake) Core 'i'	LGA 1151v2	Intel UHD 610/630	Nvidia GeForce GT 730 AMD Radeon R7 430 AMD Radeon R7 450 AMD Radeon RX 460 AMD Radeon 520 AMD Radeon 535 AMD Radeon RX 550 AMD Radeon RX 550X	DDR4, 2	32 GB	SFF, MT	Q2 2018
HP ProDesk 400 G5	Intel B360	Intel 8th gen. (Coffee Lake) Core 'i' Intel 9th gen. (Coffee Lake) Core 'i'	LGA 1151v2	Intel UHD 610/630	No GPU slot	DDR4, 2	64 GB	DM	Q4 2019
HP ProOne 400 G5	Intel Q370	Intel 8th gen. (Coffee Lake) Core 'i' Intel 9th gen. (Coffee Lake) Core 'i'	LGA 1151v2	Intel UHD 610/630	AMD Radeon 535	DDR4, 2	64 GB	AiO	Q4 2019
HP ProDesk 400 G6	Intel B360	Intel 8th gen. (Coffee Lake) Core 'i' Intel 9th gen. (Coffee Lake) Core 'i'	LGA 1151v2	Intel UHD 610/630	Nvidia GeForce GT 730 AMD Radeon R7 430 AMD Radeon 520 AMD Radeon RX 550X	DDR4, 2	64 GB	SFF, MT	Q4 2019
HP ProDesk 400 G6	Intel Q470	Intel 10th gen. (Comet Lake) Core 'i'	LGA 1200	Intel UHD 610/630	No GPU slot	DDR4, 2	64 GB	DM	Q3 2020
HP ProOne 400 G6	Intel Q470	Intel 10th gen. (Comet Lake) Core 'i'	LGA 1200	Intel UHD 610/630	Radeon 630	DDR4, 2	64 GB	AiO	Q3 2020
HP ProDesk 400 G7	Intel Q470	Intel 10th gen. (Comet Lake) Core 'i'	LGA 1200	Intel UHD 610/630	AMD Radeon R7 430 AMD Radeon 520 AMD Radeon RX 550X	DDR4, 2	64 GB	SFF, MT	Q3 2020
HP ProDesk 405 G1	AMD Jaguar APU (Kabini)		FT3	AMD Radeon HD 8240/8330/8400	Nvidia Quadro NVS 310 Nvidia Quadro NVS 315 Nvidia GeForce GT 630 AMD Radeon HD 8350 AMD Radeon HD 8470 AMD Radeon HD 8490	DDR3, 2	16 GB	SFF, MT	2014
HP ProDesk 405 G2	AMD Puma APU (Beema)		FT3b	AMD Radeon R2/R3/R5	Nvidia Quadro NVS 310 Nvidia Quadro NVS 315 Nvidia GeForce GT 630 AMD Radeon HD 8350 AMD Radeon HD 8470 AMD Radeon HD 8490 AMD Radeon R7 240 AMD Radeon R7 255	DDR3, 2	16 GB	SFF, MT	2015
HP ProDesk 405 G4	AMD B350	AMD Ryzen 2000G	Socket AM4	AMD Radeon Vega 8/11	Nvidia GeForce GT 730 AMD Radeon R7 430 AMD Radeon RX 550X	DDR4, 2	32 GB	SFF, DM	2018
HP ProDesk 405 G6	AMD PRO565	AMD Athlon AMD Ryzen 4000	Socket AM4	AMD Radeon Vega 8/11	AMD Radeon R7 430 AMD Radeon R7 430 DP AMD Radeon RX550	DDR4, 2	64GB	SFF, DM	2020
HP ProDesk 405 G8	AMD PRO565	AMD Ryzen 5000	Socket AM4	AMD Radeon Vega Graphics	AMD Radeon RX 550X 4GB AMD Radeon R7 430	DDR4, 2	64GB	SFF, DM	2022

=== Advanced/Pro series ===
Model	Chipset	CPU	Platform	GPU		RAM		Chassis	Released
Model	Chipset	CPU	Platform	Integrated	Discrete	Type	Max	Chassis	Released
HP Compaq d325	Nvidia nForce 2	AMD Athlon XP	Socket A	Nvidia GeForce4 MX	Nvidia GeForce4 MX440-8x	DDR, 2	2 GB	MT, SFF	Q3 2003
HP Compaq d330	Intel 865G	Intel Pentium 4	Socket 478	Intel Extreme Graphics 2	Nvidia Quadro4 100NVS AGP Nvidia Quadro4 100NVS PCI Nvidia GeForce4 MX440-8x	DDR, 4	4 GB	DT, MT, SFF	May 21, 2003
HP Compaq dc5000	Intel 865GV	Intel Pentium 4	Socket 478	Intel Extreme Graphics 2	(No GPU slot) Nvidia Quadro NVS 280 PCI	DDR, 4	4 GB	MT, SFF	Q1 2004
HP Compaq dc5100	Intel 915GV	Intel Pentium 4	LGA 775	Intel GMA 900	(No GPU slot) Nvidia Quadro NVS 55 PCI Nvidia Quadro NVS 280 PCI	DDR2, 4	4 GB	MT, SFF	Q1 2005
HP Compaq dx5150	ATI Radeon Xpress 200	AMD Athlon 64 X2, Athlon 64, Sempron	Socket 939	ATI Radeon Xpress 200	ATI Radeon X300 SE ATI Radeon X1300	DDR, 4	4 GB	MT, SFF	Q2 2005
HP Compaq dc5700	Intel Q963 Express	Intel Core 2, Pentium D, Pentium 4	LGA 775	Intel GMA 3000	(No GPU slot) Nvidia Quadro NVS 55 PCI Nvidia Quadro NVS 280 PCI	DDR2, 4	4 GB	MT, SFF	Q4 2006
HP Compaq dc5750	ATI Radeon Xpress 1150	AMD Athlon 64 X2, Athlon 64, Sempron	Socket AM2	ATI Radeon Xpress 1150	ATI Radeon X1300 Pro ATI Radeon X1600 XT	DDR2, 4	8 GB	MT, SFF	Q4 2006
HP Compaq dc5800	Intel Q33 Express	Intel Core 2	LGA 775	Intel GMA 3100	Nvidia Quadro NVS 290 Nvidia GeForce 8400 GS ATI Radeon HD 2400 XT ATI Radeon HD 3470 ATI Radeon HD 3650 (MT only)	DDR2, 4	8 GB	MT, SFF	Q1 2008
HP Compaq dc5850	AMD 780V	AMD Athlon 64 X2, Athlon 64, AMD Phenom	Socket AM2+	ATI Radeon 3100	Nvidia Quadro NVS 290 Nvidia GeForce 8400 GS ATI Radeon HD 2400 XT ATI Radeon HD 3470 ATI Radeon HD 3650 (MT only)	DDR2, 4	16 GB	MT, SFF	Q4 2008
HP Compaq dc5850	AMD 780V	AMD Athlon 64 X2, Athlon 64, AMD Phenom	Socket AM2+	ATI Radeon 3100	ATI Radeon HD 4550	DDR2, 4	16 GB	MT, SFF	Q4 2008
HP Compaq 6000 Pro	Intel Q43 Express	Intel Core 2	LGA 775	Intel GMA X4500	NVIDIA Quadro NVS 290	DDR3, 4	16 GB	MT, SFF, AIO	Q4 2009
HP Compaq 6005 Pro/6005 Pro SFF	AMD 785G	AMD Athlon II X2 B26, Sempron or AMD Phenom II x86-64/x86-32	Socket AM3	ATI Radeon HD 4200	NVIDIA Quadro NVS 290	DDR3, 4	16 GB	MT, SFF, USDT	Q3 2010
HP Compaq 6200 Pro	Intel Q65 Express	Intel 2nd gen. (Sandy Bridge) Core 'i'	LGA 1155	Intel HD 2000/3000	Nvidia Quadro NVS 295 Nvidia Quadro NVS 300 Nvidia GeForce 405 (China only) AMD FirePro 2270 AMD Radeon HD 6350 AMD Radeon HD 6450 AMD Radeon HD 6570 (MT only)	DDR3, 4	32 GB	MT, SFF	Q1 2011
HP Compaq 6300 Pro	Intel Q75 Express	Intel 2nd gen. (Sandy Bridge) Core 'i' Intel 3rd gen. (Ivy Bridge) Core 'i'	LGA 1155	Intel HD 2000/3000 Intel HD 2500/4000	Nvidia Quadro NVS 300 Nvidia Quadro NVS 310 AMD Radeon HD 6350 AMD Radeon HD 7450	DDR3, 4	32 GB	MT, SFF, AIO	Q3 2012
HP Compaq 6305 Pro	AMD A75	AMD Piledriver (Trinitry and Richland APU)	Socket FM2	AMD APU Graphics	Nvidia Quadro NVS 300 Nvidia Quadro NVS 310 AMD Radeon HD 6350 AMD Radeon HD 7450	DDR3, 4	32 GB	MT, SFF	Q4 2012
HP ProDesk/ProOne 600 G1	Intel Q85 Express	Intel 4th gen. (Haswell) Core 'i'	LGA 1150	Intel HD 4400/4600	Nvidia GeForce GT 630 Nvidia Quadro NVS 310 Nvidia Quadro NVS 315 AMD Radeon HD 7650A (AIO only) AMD Radeon HD 8350 AMD Radeon HD 8490	DDR3, 4 (TWR, SFF) 2 (DM, AIO)	32 GB (TWR, SFF) 16 GB (DM, AIO)	TWR, SFF, DM, AIO	Q1 2014
HP ProDesk/ProOne 600 G2	Intel Q150	Intel 6th gen. (Skylake) Core 'i'	LGA 1151	Intel HD 510/530	Nvidia GeForce GT 720 (MT/China only) Nvidia GeForce GT 730 Nvidia Quadro NVS 310 AMD Radeon R2 320 (MT only) AMD Radeon R9 350 (MT/China only)	DDR4, 4 (MT, SFF); 2 (DM, AIO)	64 GB (MT, SFF); 32 GB (DM, AIO)	MT, SFF, DM, AIO	Q4 2015
HP ProDesk/ProOne 600 G3	Intel Q270	Intel 6th gen. (Skylake) Core 'i' Intel 7th gen. (Kaby Lake) Core 'i'	LGA 1151	Intel HD 510/530 Intel HD 610/630	Nvidia GeForce GT 730 AMD Radeon R7 430 AMD Radeon R7 450 (MT only) AMD Radeon RX 460 (MT only)	DDR4, 4 (MT, SFF); 2 (DM, AIO)	64 GB (MT, SFF); 32 GB (DM, AIO)	MT, SFF, DM, AIO(available 2H 2017)	Q1 2017
HP ProDesk/ProOne 600 G4	Intel Q370	Intel 8th gen. (Coffee Lake) Core 'i'	LGA 1151v2	Intel UHD 610/630	Nvidia GeForce GT 730 Nvidia GeForce GTX 1060 6 GB (MT only) Nvidia GeForce RTX 2060 (MT only) AMD Radeon R7 430 AMD Radeon 520 AMD Radeon 535 (AIO only) AMD Radeon RX 550 (SFF only) AMD Radeon RX 550X AMD Radeon RX 580 (MT only)	DDR4, 4 (MT, SFF); 2 (DM, AIO)	64 GB (MT, SFF); 32 GB (DM, AIO)	MT, SFF, DM, AIO	Q2 2018
HP ProDesk/ProOne 600 G5	Intel Q370	Intel 8th gen. (Coffee Lake) Core 'i' Intel 9th gen. (Coffee Lake) Core 'i'	LGA 1151v2	Intel UHD 610/630	Nvidia GeForce GT 730 Nvidia GeForce RTX 2060 (MT only) AMD Radeon R7 430 AMD Radeon 520 AMD Radeon 535 (AIO only) AMD Radeon RX 550X AMD Radeon RX 580 (MT only)	DDR4, 4 (MT, SFF); 2 (DM, AIO)	128 GB (MT, SFF); 64 GB (DM, AIO)	MT, SFF, DM, AIO	Q3 2019
HP ProDesk/ProOne 600 G6	Intel Q470	Intel 10th gen. (Comet Lake) Core 'i'	LGA 1200	Intel UHD 610/630	Nvidia GeForce RTX 2060 Super (MT only) AMD Radeon R7 430 AMD Radeon 630 (AIO only) AMD Radeon RX 550X AMD Radeon RX 580 (MT only)	DDR4, 4 (MT, SFF); 2 (DM, AIO)	128 GB (MT, SFF); 64 GB (DM, AIO)	MT, SFF, DM, AIO	Q3 2020

=== Elite series ===
Model	Chipset	CPU	Platform	GPU		RAM		Chassis	Released
Model	Chipset	CPU	Platform	Integrated	Discrete	Type	Max	Chassis	Released
HP Compaq d530	Intel 865G	Intel Pentium 4	Socket 478	Intel Extreme Graphics 2	Nvidia Quadro4 100NVS AGP Nvidia Quadro4 100NVS PCI Nvidia GeForce4 MX440-8x	DDR, 4	4 GB	CMT, SFF, USDT	May 21, 2003
HP Compaq dx6100	Intel 915G	Intel Pentium 4	LGA 775	Intel GMA 900	ATI Radeon X300 SE	DDR, 4	4 GB	MT, ST	Q2 2004
HP Compaq dx6120	Intel 915G	Intel Pentium 4	LGA 775	Intel GMA 900	ATI Radeon X300 SE ATI Radeon X1300	DDR2, 4	4 GB	MT, ST	2005
HP Compaq dc7100	Intel 915G	Intel Pentium 4	LGA 775	Intel GMA 900	ATI Radeon X300 SE Nvidia Quadro NVS 55 PCI Nvidia Quadro NVS 280 PCI	DDR, 4	4 GB	CMT, SFF, USDT	Q2 2004
HP Compaq dc7600	Intel 945G	Intel Pentium D, Pentium 4	LGA 775	Intel GMA 950	ATI Radeon X300 SE Nvidia Quadro NVS 50 PCI Nvidia Quadro NVS 280 PCI	DDR2, 4	4 GB	CMT, SFF, USDT	Q2 2005
HP Compaq dc7700	Intel Q965	Intel Core 2, Pentium D, Pentium 4	LGA 775	Intel GMA 3000	Nvidia Quadro NVS 280 PCI Nvidia Quadro NVS 285 ATI Radeon X1300 ATI Radeon X1300 Pro ATI Radeon X1600 XT	DDR2, 4	8 GB	CMT, SFF, USDT	Q3 2006
HP Compaq dc7800	Intel Q35	Intel Core 2	LGA 775	Intel GMA 3100	Nvidia Quadro NVS 290 Nvidia GeForce 8400 GS ATI Radeon X1600 XT ATI Radeon HD 2400 XT ATI Radeon HD 3470 ATI Radeon HD 3650	DDR2, 4	8 GB	CMT, SFF, USDT	Q4 2007
HP Compaq dc7900	Intel Q45	Intel Core 2	LGA 775	Intel GMA X4500	Nvidia Quadro NVS 290 Nvidia Quadro NVS 295 ATI Radeon HD 2400 XT ATI Radeon HD 3470 ATI Radeon HD 3650 ATI Radeon HD 4550	DDR2, 4	16 GB	CMT, SFF, USDT	Q3 2008
HP Elite 7000	Intel P55	Intel 1st gen. (Nehalem) Core 'i'	LGA 1156	—N/a	Nvidia GeForce 210 Nvidia GeForce GT 230 ATI Radeon HD 4550 ATI Radeon HD 4650	DDR3, 4	16 GB	MT	Q4 2009
HP Elite 7100	Intel H57	Intel 1st gen. (Nehalem) Core 'i'	LGA 1156	Intel HD Graphics (i3 5xx/i5 6xx only)	Nvidia GeForce 210 Nvidia GeForce GT 230 ATI Radeon HD 4550 ATI Radeon HD 4650 ATI Radeon HD 5450	DDR3, 4	16 GB	MT	Q1 2010
HP Elite 7200	Intel H67	Intel 2nd gen. (Sandy Bridge) Core 'i'	LGA 1155	Intel HD 2000/3000	Nvidia GeForce 210 Nvidia GeForce 405 Nvidia GeForce GT 420 Nvidia GeForce GT 440 ATI Radeon HD 5450 AMD Radeon HD 6450 AMD Radeon HD 6570	DDR3, 4	32GB	MT	Q1 2011
HP Elite 7300	Intel H67	Intel 2nd gen. (Sandy Bridge) Core 'i'	LGA 1155	Intel HD 2000/3000	Nvidia GeForce 405 Nvidia GeForce GT 420 Nvidia GeForce GT 440 Nvidia GeForce GT 520 Nvidia GeForce GT 530 Nvidia GeForce GT 545 AMD Radeon HD 6450 AMD Radeon HD 6570	DDR3, 4	32GB	MT	Q1 2012
HP Elite 7500	Intel Z75	Intel 2nd gen. (Sandy Bridge) Core 'i' Intel 3rd gen. (Ivy Bridge) Core 'i'	LGA 1155	Intel HD 2000/3000 Intel HD 2500/4000	Nvidia GeForce GT 520 Nvidia GeForce GT 530 Nvidia GeForce GT 545 Nvidia GeForce GT 620 Nvidia GeForce GT 630 Nvidia GeForce GT 640 AMD Radeon HD 7450 AMD Radeon HD 7570	DDR3, 4	32 GB	MT	Q4 2012
HP Compaq Elite 8000	Intel Q45	Intel Core 2	LGA 775	Intel GMA X4500	Nvidia Quadro NVS 290 Nvidia Quadro NVS 295 Nvidia Quadro NVS 300 Nvidia GeForce 310 ATI Radeon HD 4550 ATI Radeon HD 4650	DDR3, 4	16 GB	CMT, SFF, US	Q4 2009
HP Compaq Elite 8100	Intel Q57	Intel 1st gen. (Nehalem) Core 'i'	LGA 1156	Intel HD Graphics (i3 5xx/i5 6xx only)	Nvidia Quadro NVS 290 Nvidia Quadro NVS 295 Nvidia GeForce 310 ATI Radeon HD 4550 ATI Radeon HD 4650	DDR3, 4	32 GB	CMT, SFF	Q1 2010
HP Compaq Elite 8200	Intel Q67	Intel 2nd gen. (Sandy Bridge) Core 'i'	LGA 1155	Intel HD 2000/3000	Nvidia Quadro NVS 295 Nvidia Quadro NVS 300 Nvidia Quadro NVS 310 Nvidia GeForce 405 AMD FirePro 2270 ATI Radeon HD 5450 (USDT only) AMD Radeon HD 6350 AMD Radeon HD 6450 AMD Radeon HD 6570 (MT/CMT only)	DDR3, 4	32 GB	CMT, MT, SFF, US, AIO	Q1 2011
HP Compaq Elite 8300	Intel Q77	Intel 2nd gen. (Sandy Bridge) Core 'i' Intel 3rd gen. (Ivy Bridge) Core 'i'	LGA 1155	Intel HD 2000/3000 Intel HD 2500/4000	Nvidia Quadro NVS 300 Nvidia Quadro NVS 310 Nvidia GeForce GT 630 (MT/CMT only) AMD Radeon HD 7450 AMD Radeon HD 7650A (USDT only)	DDR3, 4	32 GB	CMT, MT, SFF, US, AIO	Q3 2012
HP EliteDesk 800 G1	Intel Q87	Intel 4th gen. (Haswell) Core 'i'	LGA 1150	Intel HD 4400/4600	Nvidia Quadro NVS 310 Nvidia Quadro NVS 315 Nvidia GeForce GT 630 (TWR only) AMD Radeon HD 7650A (USDT only) AMD Radeon HD 8350 AMD Radeon HD 8490 AMD Radeon R7 240 AMD Radeon R7 255 (TWR only)	DDR3, 4	32 GB	TWR, SFF, US, DM	Q1 2014
HP EliteOne 800 G1	Intel Q87	Intel 4th gen. (Haswell) Core 'i'	LGA 1150	Intel HD 4400/4600	AMD Radeon HD 7650A	DDR3, 2	16 GB	AIO	Q1 2014
HP EliteDesk 800 G2	Intel Q170	Intel 6th gen. (Skylake) Core 'i'	LGA 1151	Intel HD 510/530	Nvidia Quadro NVS 310 Nvidia GeForce GT 720 (China only) Nvidia GeForce GT 730 Nvidia GeForce GTX 960 AMD Radeon R5 320 (China only) AMD Radeon R9 350 (TWR only)	DDR4, 4	64 GB	DM, SFF, TWR	Q4 2015
HP EliteOne 800 G2	Intel Q170	Intel 6th gen. (Skylake) Core 'i'	LGA 1151	Intel HD 510/530	AMD Radeon R9 360	DDR4, 2	32 GB	AIO	Q4 2015
HP EliteDesk 800 G3	Intel Q270	Intel 6th gen. (Skylake) Core 'i' Intel 7th gen. (Kaby Lake) Core 'i'	LGA 1151	Intel HD 510/530 Intel HD 610/630	Nvidia GeForce GT 730 Nvidia GeForce GTX 1060 3 GB Nvidia GeForce GTX 1070 Nvidia GeForce GTX 1080 AMD Radeon R7 430 AMD Radeon R7 450 AMD Radeon RX 460 AMD Radeon RX 480	DDR4, 4	64 GB	DM, SFF, TWR	Q1 2017
HP EliteOne 800 G3	Intel Q270	Intel 6th gen. (Skylake) Core 'i' Intel 7th gen. (Kaby Lake) Core 'i'	LGA 1151	Intel HD 510/530 Intel HD 610/630	AMD Radeon RX 460	DDR4, 2	32 GB	AIO	Q1 2017
HP EliteDesk 800 G4	Intel Q370	Intel 8th gen. (Coffee Lake) Core 'i'	LGA 1151v2	Intel UHD 610/630	Nvidia Quadro P400 Nvidia Quadro P620 Nvidia GeForce GT 730 Nvidia GeForce GTX 1060 3 GB Nvidia GeForce RTX 2070 Nvidia GeForce RTX 2080 AMD Radeon R7 430 AMD Radeon 520 AMD Radeon RX 550 AMD Radeon RX 560 (DM only) AMD Radeon RX 560X (DM only) AMD Radeon RX 580	DDR4, 4	64 GB	DM, SFF, TWR	Q1 2018
HP EliteOne 800 G4	Intel Q370	Intel 8th gen. (Coffee Lake) Core 'i'	LGA 1151v2	Intel UHD 610/630	AMD Radeon RX 560 AMD Radeon RX 560X	DDR4, 2	32 GB	AIO	Q1 2018
HP EliteDesk 800 G5	Intel Q370	Intel 8th gen. (Coffee Lake) Core 'i' Intel 9th gen. (Coffee Lake) Core 'i'	LGA 1151v2	Intel UHD 610/630	Nvidia Quadro P400 Nvidia Quadro P620 Nvidia Quadro P1000 Nvidia GeForce GT 730 Nvidia GeForce RTX 2060 Nvidia GeForce RTX 2070 Nvidia GeForce RTX 2070 Super Nvidia GeForce RTX 2080 AMD Radeon R7 430 AMD Radeon 520 AMD Radeon RX 550 AMD Radeon RX 560X (DM only) AMD Radeon RX 580	DDR4, 4	128 GB	DM, SFF, TWR	Q1 2019
HP EliteOne 800 G5	Intel Q370	Intel 8th gen. (Coffee Lake) Core 'i' Intel 9th gen. (Coffee Lake) Core 'i'	LGA 1151v2	Intel UHD 610/630	AMD Radeon RX 560X	DDR4, 2	64 GB	AIO	Q1 2019
HP EliteDesk 800 G6	Intel Q470	Intel 10th gen. (Comet Lake) Core 'i'	LGA 1200	Intel UHD 610/630	Nvidia Quadro P400 Nvidia Quadro P620 Nvidia Quadro P1000 Nvidia Quadro P2200 Nvidia GeForce GTX 1660 Ti (DM only) Nvidia GeForce RTX 2060 Super Nvidia GeForce RTX 2070 Super Nvidia GeForce RTX 2080 Super AMD Radeon R7 430 AMD Radeon RX 550X	DDR4, 4	128 GB	DM, SFF, TWR	Q3 2020
HP EliteOne 800 G6	Intel Q470	Intel 10th gen. (Comet Lake) Core 'i'	LGA 1200	Intel UHD 610/630	AMD Radeon RX 5300	DDR4, 2	64 GB	AIO	Q3 2020
HP EliteOne 1000 G1	Intel Q270	Intel 6th gen. (Skylake) Core 'i' Intel 7th gen. (Kaby Lake) Core 'i'	LGA 1151	Intel HD 510/530 Intel HD 610/630	No GPU slot	DDR4, 2	32 GB	AIO	Q1 2017
HP EliteOne 1000 G2	Intel Q370	Intel 8th gen. (Coffee Lake) Core 'i'	LGA 1151v2	Intel UHD 610/630	AMD Radeon RX 560 AMD Radeon RX 560X	DDR4, 2	32 GB	AIO	Q1 2018
HP EliteDesk 705 G1	AMD A88X	AMD PRO A-Series APU (Kaveri)	Socket FM2+	AMD Radeon R5/R7	Nvidia Quadro NVS 310 Nvidia Quadro NVS 315 Nvidia GeForce GT 630 AMD Radeon HD 8350 AMD Radeon HD 8490 AMD Radeon R7 240 AMD Radeon R7 255	DDR3, 4	32 GB	DM, SFF, TWR	2014
HP EliteOne 705 G1	AMD A88X	AMD PRO A-Series APU (Kaveri)	Socket FM2+	AMD Radeon R5/R7	No GPU slot	DDR3, 2	16 GB	AIO	2014
HP EliteDesk 705 G2	AMD A78	AMD PRO A-Series APU (Kaveri/Godavari)	Socket FM2+	AMD Radeon R5/R7	Nvidia Quadro NVS 310 Nvidia GeForce GT 720 (China only) Nvidia GeForce GT 730 AMD Radeon R9 350	DDR3, 4	32 GB	DM, SFF, TWR	2015
HP EliteOne 705 G2	AMD A78	AMD PRO A-Series APU (Kaveri/Godavari)	Socket FM2+	AMD Radeon R5/R7	No GPU slot	DDR3, 2	16 GB	AIO	2015
HP EliteDesk 705 G3	AMD B350	AMD: 6th gen. Pro A-Series 7th gen. Pro A-Series Ryzen PRO 1000 Ryzen PRO 2000 Ryzen PRO 2000G	Socket AM4	AMD Radeon R5/R7 (6th/7th gen APU) AMD Radeon Vega 8/11 (Ryzen PRO 2000G) N/A (Ryzen PRO 1000/2000)	Nvidia Quadro NVS 310 Nvidia GeForce GT 730 AMD Radeon R9 350 AMD Radeon R5 420 AMD Radeon R7 430 AMD Radeon R7 450 AMD Radeon RX 460 AMD Radeon RX 480	DDR4, 4	64 GB	DM, SFF, TWR	2017
HP EliteDesk 705 G4	AMD B350	AMD: 6th gen. Pro A-Series 7th gen. Pro A-Series Ryzen PRO 1000 Ryzen PRO 2000 Ryzen PRO 2000G	Socket AM4	AMD Radeon R5/R7 (6th/7th gen APU) AMD Radeon Vega 8/11 (Ryzen PRO 2000G) N/A (Ryzen PRO 1000/2000)	Nvidia GeForce GT 730 Nvidia GeForce GTX 1060 3 GB Nvidia GeForce RTX 2060 AMD Radeon R7 430 AMD Radeon 520 AMD Radeon RX 550 AMD Radeon RX 560 AMD Radeon RX 560X AMD Radeon RX 580	DDR4, 4	64 GB	DM, SFF, TWR	2018
HP EliteDesk 705 G5	AMD PRO 560	AMD: Ryzen PRO 3000 Ryzen PRO 3000G	Socket AM4	AMD Radeon Vega 3/8/11 (Ryzen PRO 3000G) N/A (Ryzen PRO 3000)	Nvidia GeForce GT 730 AMD Radeon R7 430 AMD Radeon RX 550 AMD Radeon RX 560X	DDR4, 4	128 GB	DM, SFF, TWR	2019
HP EliteDesk 805 G6	AMD PRO 565	AMD Ryzen PRO 4000	Socket AM4	AMD Radeon Vega	AMD Radeon RX 550X AMD Radeon R7 430 NVIDIA Quadro P400 NVIDIA GeForce GT1660Ti	DDR4,2 (SFF) DDR4,4 (DM)	64GB (SFF) 128GB (DM)	DM, SFF	2019
HP EliteDesk 805 G8	AMD PRO 565	AMD Ryzen 5000	Socket AM4	AMD Radeon Vega	AMD Radeon RX 550X AMD Radeon R7 430 NVIDIA Quadro P400 NVIDIA GeForce GT1660Ti	DDR4, 2 (SFF) DDR4, 4 (DM)	64GB (SFF) 128GB (DM)	DM, SFF	2022

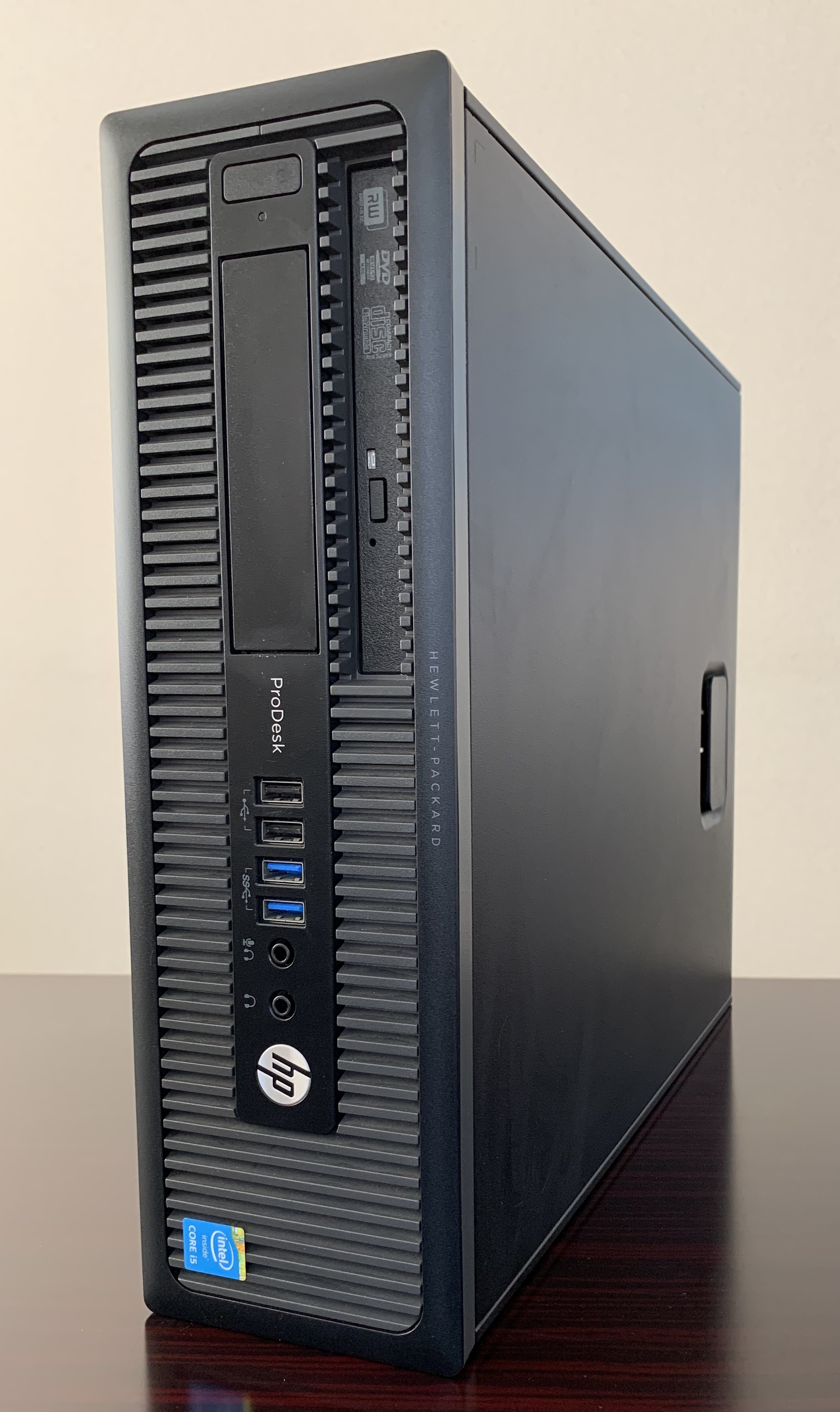
HP ProDesk 600, SFF size

TWR – Tower
(C)MT – (Convertible) Minitower
ST – Slim Tower
SFF – Small Form Factor
US(DT) – Ultra-slim (Desktop)
DM – Desktop Mini
AIO – All-in-One

== See also ==
- List of Hewlett-Packard products
