= Jeanneau Brio =

Sailboat class

Jeanneau Brio fixed keel
Development
- Designer: Philippe Harlé
- Location: France
- Year: 1979
- Builder: Jeanneau
- Role: Cruiser
- Name: Jeanneau Brio fixed keel

Boat
- Displacement: 2,646 lb (1,200 kg)
- Draft: 3.61 ft (1.10 m)

Hull
- Type: monohull
- Construction: fiberglass
- LOA: 21.65 ft (6.60 m)
- LWL: 18.20 ft (5.55 m)
- Beam: 8.20 ft (2.50 m)
- Engine: outboard motor

Hull appendages
- Keel: fin keel
- Ballast: 1,168 lb (530 kg)
- Rudder: transom-mounted rudder

Rig
- Rig type: Bermuda rig

Sails
- Sailplan: masthead sloop
- Total sail area: 215.00 sq ft (19.974 m^{2})

The Jeanneau Brio is a French trailerable sailboat that was designed by Philippe Harlé as a pocket cruiser and first built in 1979.

The Brio is a development of the 1971 Jeanneau Love Love, incorporating a new raised deck design.

== Production ==
The design was built by Jeanneau in France, starting in 1979, but it is now out of production.

== Design ==
The Brio is a recreational keelboat, built predominantly of fiberglass. It has a masthead sloop rig. The hull has a raked stem, a reverse transom a transom-hung rudder controlled by a tiller and a fixed fin keel or stub keel and retractable centerboard. The boat is normally fitted with a small outboard motor for docking and maneuvering.

The design has sleeping accommodation for four people, with a truncated double "V"-berth in the bow cabin and two straight settees in the main cabin around a table. The galley is located on both sides just aft of the bow cabin, with a single burner stove to port and a sink to starboard.

The design has a hull speed of 5.72 kn (10.59 km/h).

== Variants ==
Brio fixed keel
This fixed keel model displaces 2,646 lb (1,200 kg) and carries 1,168 lb (530 kg) of ballast. The boat has a draft of 3.61 ft (1.10 m) with the standard keel.
Brio centerboard
This stub keel and centerboard model displaces 2,756 lb (1,250 kg). The boat has a draft of 2.3 ft (0.70 m) with the centerboard retracted.

== See also ==
- List of sailing boat types

Related development

- Jeanneau Love Love
