= Architecture Brio =

Architectural firm in India

Architecture BRIO

Practice information
- Key architects: Robert Verrijt; Shefali Balwani
- Founded: 2006
- Location: Mumbai, India

Significant works and honors
- Projects: House on a Stream, Alibag; Himalayan Biodiversity Training Institute, Sikkim; Sikkim Butterfly Reserve; Laureus Learning Pavilion the Riparian House, Karjat; Etania Green School, Malaysia
- Awards: Archiprix 2004 for House on a Stream: NDTV Design and Architecture of the Year Awards – 2013; Trends Excellence Awards – 2014; 24th Architecture of the Year Award – 2014 for Casa BRIO; NDTV Design and Architecture of the Year Awards – 2015; AD50 Most influential names in Indian Architecture and Design 2014 AD50 Most influential names in Indian Architecture and Design 2016

Website
- www.architecturebrio.com

Architecture Brio is an international architecture firm based in Rotterdam and Mumbai founded in 2006, focusing on the fields of architecture, interior, and sustainable design.

The company's team of architects is led by Shefali Balwani (Center for Environmental Planning and Technology, India) and Robert Verrijt (Technical University Delft, the Netherlands).

== Awards ==
Architecture Brio architect, Robert Verrijt, was awarded the second prize in the Dutch Archiprix 2004 for his design of an Asylum Seekers Centre in Maastricht.

Together with Floris Cornelisse, Verrijt won the first prize for the entry Triade in the Europan 8 Competition 2005.

Verrijt was awarded three grants from The Netherlands Foundation for Visual Arts, Design and Architecture.
