= HP Vectra =

Line of business-oriented personal computers

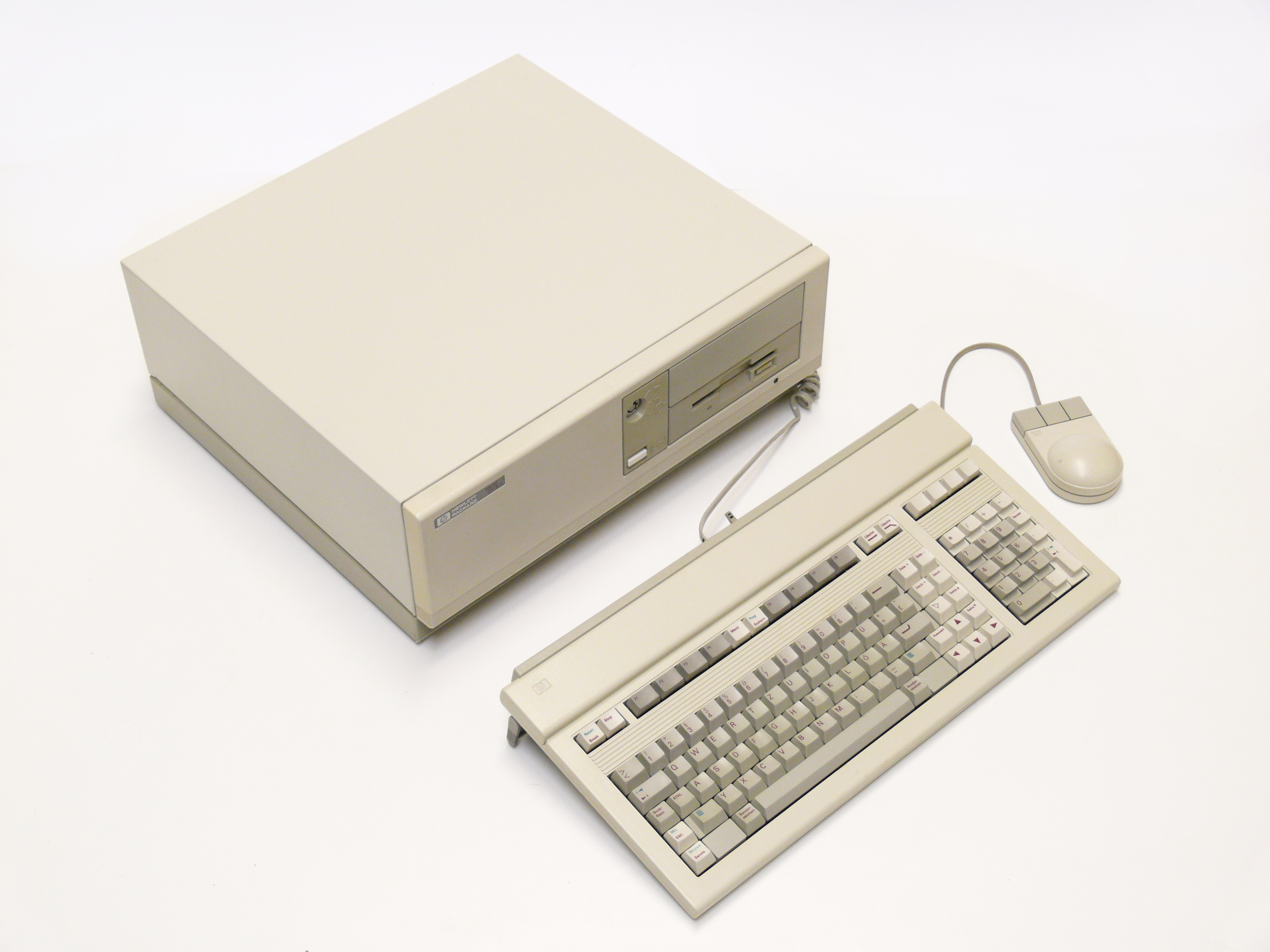
- HP Vectra QS/16S (1989)
- Manufacturer: Hewlett-Packard (HP Inc.)
- Type: Personal computer
- Released: 1985
- Discontinued: 2002
- CPU: Intel 80286, 8 MHz
- Predecessor: HP-150
- Successor: HP Evo (business); HP Pavilion (home/home office)

HP Vectra was a line of business-oriented personal computers manufactured by Hewlett-Packard (now HP Inc.). It was introduced in October 1985 as HP's first IBM-compatible PC.

Hewlett-Packard, which originally made its name through selling test equipment, made its move into the computing field in 1967 with HP 1000/2100 minicomputers. Further minicomputer and terminal products followed in the coming years, and in 1983, the company finally released a microcomputer, the HP 150 series. It only lasted two years before HP embraced the IBM PC standard with the Vectra line. Mainly targeted at business and professional fields, the Vectra was HP's top-of-the-line family of personal computers for over 15 years.

HP Vectra PC with an Intel 286 CPU at the Vintage Computer Fair in suburban Chicago 2026.

InfoWorld stated that HP was "responding to demands from its customers for full IBM PC compatibility". Vectras were not entirely IBM-compatible, and in the early years, had a considerable amount of non-standard hardware features, including hard disk types, keyboards, and the mouse interface, and corresponding BIOS extensions named EX-BIOS, thus requiring their own custom OEM version of MS-DOS. Software that used strictly BIOS calls would work, but anything that performed low-level hardware access often had problems. Vectras notably failed to pass the most popular compatibility test of the day, which involved running Lotus 1-2-3 and Microsoft Flight Simulator. By the time 486 PCs became commonplace, however, most of the proprietary hardware in HP machines had been dropped.

In 1995, HP added the Pavilion line as a lower-end range designed for the consumer markets (which the company had ignored up to this point), including both desktop PCs and the company's early laptops. In 2002 (following the HP-Compaq merger and the release of the VL420 and e-pc 42 models a year prior), the Vectra family was discontinued, and was replaced by the Evo, which was originally developed by Compaq.
