= Compaq Professional Workstation =

Family of computer workstations

- Developer: Compaq
- Type: Workstation
- Released: November 1996
- Discontinued: 2002
- CPU: Pentium Pro; Pentium II; Pentium II Xeon; Pentium III; Pentium III Xeon; Alpha 21264

The Compaq Professional Workstation was a family of workstations produced by Compaq. Introduced in late October 1996, the first entry in the family featured single or dual Pentium Pro processors. Later entries featured Pentium IIs and IIIs; the XP1000 was the only non-x86 based entry, featuring a DEC Alpha processor. Compaq aimed the Professional Workstation at computer-aided design users, software programmers, multimedia designers and financial workers. While workers of those fields primarily ran Unix-based operating systems on workstations at the time, the Compaq Professional Workstation came preinstalled with Windows NT 4.0 Workstation (later Windows 2000 Professional). The line was discontinued in 2002.

== Models ==
Compaq Professional Workstations
Model	Processor(s)	Clock speed (MHz)	Max. RAM	L2 cache	Date introduced
5000	Pentium Pro (dual or single)	200	512 MB		November 1996
5100	Pentium II (dual or single)	300	512 MB	512 KB	September 1997
6000	Pentium II (dual or single)	266–300	256 MB	512 KB	June 1997
8000	Pentium Pro (dual or quad)	200	3 GB	512 KB	June 1997
AP200	Pentium II	350, 400, or 450	384 MB		July 1998
AP400	Pentium II (dual)	350 or 400	1 GB		July 1998
AP500	Pentium II (dual or single)	400 or 450	1 GB		August 1998
SP700	Pentium II Xeon	400 or 450	4 GB		October 1998
AP550	Pentium III (dual or single)	866	1 GB		November 1999
1000 XP	Alpha 21264	500–667	512 MB	4 MB	2000
SP750	Pentium III Xeon	800 or 866 or 1000	4 GB	256 KB	2001
