= Compaq ProLinea =

Series of computers by Compaq

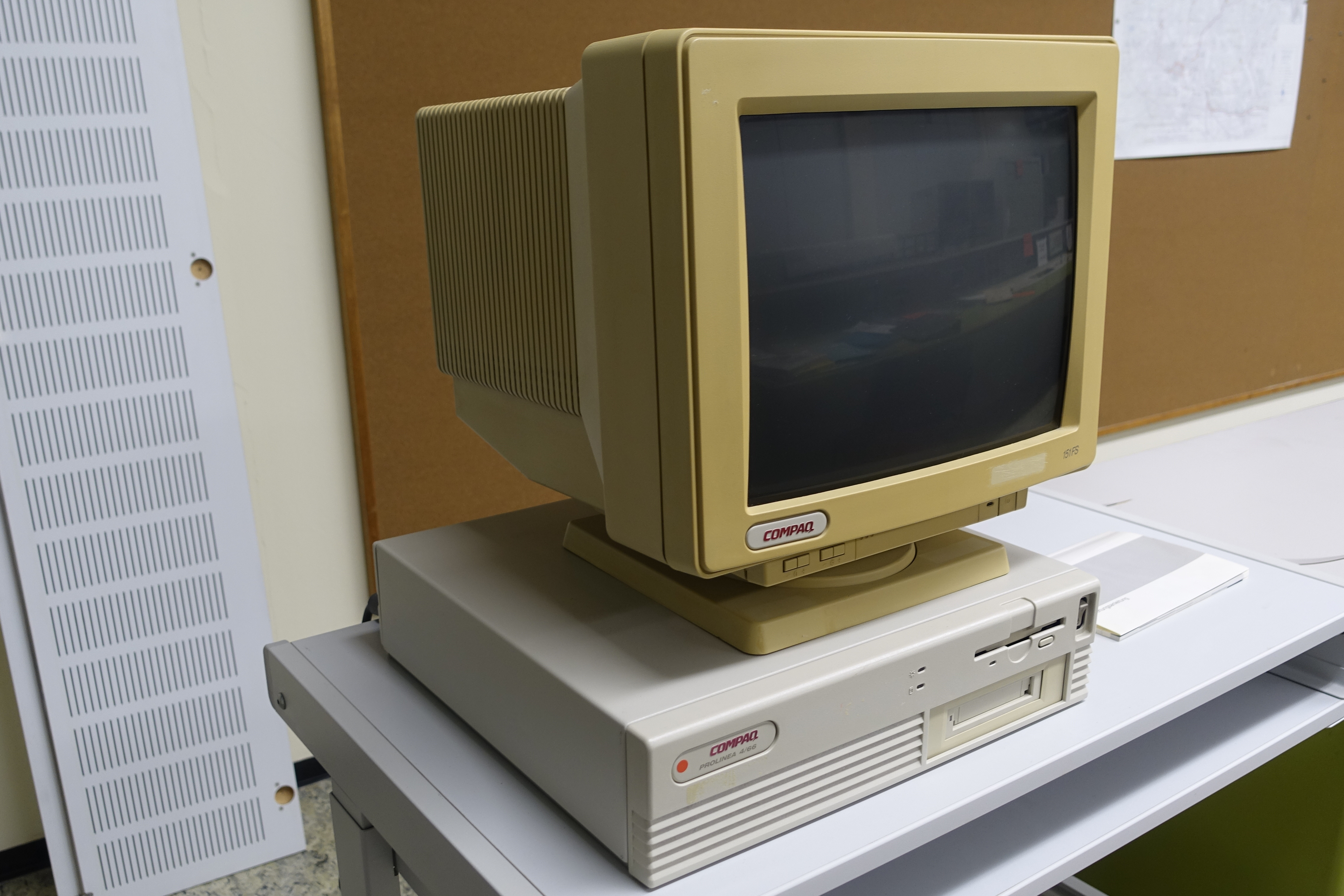
- ProLinea 4/66
- Developer: Compaq
- Type: Desktop computer
- Released: June 15, 1992; 33 years ago
- Discontinued: 1996
- CPU: i386SX; i386; i486; i486SX; Pentium

The ProLinea was a line of budget desktop computers released by Compaq from 1992 to 1996. All the machines in the line were x86-based IBM PC–compatible systems, ranging from the i386SX to Pentiums. The ProLinea was succeeded by the Presario line in 1993, although the two sold concurrently for a while.

== Release and price war ==
The ProLinea was notorious for touching off a fierce price war in the personal computer market from its launch in June 1992. Under a directive from Compaq's recent CEO Eckhard Pfeiffer, the company originally sold lower-end models in the range for under US$900—a price that was virtually unheard of for brand-new desktops from a major PC vendor. Compaq's largest competitors—including IBM, Apple, DEC, and Dell—immediately followed suit with budget, no-frills desktops of their own; IBM for example released the PS/ValuePoint for under $1,000. Smaller manufacturers meanwhile struggled to compete against the major players in this price war, leading to dozens leaving the market or going bankrupt and dissolving.

Despite numerous parts shortages, Compaq sold nearly 400,000 units from the ProLinea line through to the end of 1992, helping the company come off its financial turmoil since the ouster of Compaq's original CEO, Rod Canion, in 1991.

== See also ==
- Compaq Deskpro, the company's professional line of desktop computers
