= Eckhard Pfeiffer =

German businessman

Eckhard Pfeiffer (born August 20, 1941, in Lauban, Germany [now Lubań, Poland], died October 26, 2026 aged 85) was a businessman of German ancestry, who served as president and CEO of Compaq from 1991 to 1999. He was named as one of Time's "Cyber Elite Top 50" for 1998.

== Personal life ==
Pfeiffer's father was a prisoner of war during World War II, while Pfeiffer and his mother fled the advancing Soviet troops.

He graduated from Kaufmännische Berufsschule in 1963, and later received his MBA from Southern Methodist University, Dallas, Texas.

He was a fan of fast cars and has owned a Porsche 911 Turbo and a 1962 roadster version of the Mercedes-Benz 300 SL.

== Compaq ==
Pfeiffer joined Texas Instruments as a financial controller in Munich after graduation, and later became head of the company's Eur Calculator Dept in Nice, France,

Pfeiffer joined Compaq from Texas Instruments, and established operations from scratch in both Europe and Asia. Pfeiffer was given US$20,000 to start up Compaq Europe. He opened up Compaq's first overseas office in Munich in 1984. By 1990, Compaq Europe was a $2 billion business, and foreign sales contributed 54 percent of Compaq's revenues.

When Michael S. Swavely retired as president of Compaq's North American division on July 12, 1991, Pfeiffer was named to succeed him. Pfeiffer also received the title of Chief Operating Officer.

=== Ascension to CEO ===
Pfeiffer became president and CEO of Compaq in 1991, as a result of a boardroom coup led by board chairman Ben Rosen that forced co-founder Rod Canion to resign as president and CEO. Canion had allowed competitors such as Dell Computer, AST Research, and Gateway 2000 to undercut Compaq with cheaper offerings, that led to a $71 million loss for that quarter, Compaq's first loss as a company. An analyst stated that "Compaq has made a lot of tactical errors in the last year and a half. They were trend-setters; now they are lagging".

Rosen and Canion had disagreed about how to counter the cheaper Asian PC imports, as Canion wanted Compaq to build lower cost PCs in-house, while Rosen believed that Compaq needed to buy standard components from suppliers and reach the market faster. While Canion developed an 18-month plan to create a line of low-priced computers, Rosen sent his own Compaq engineering team to Comdex without Canion's knowledge and discovered that a low-priced PC could be made in half the time and at lower cost than Canion's initiative. In addition, it was believed that Canion's consensus-style management slowed the company's ability to react in the market, whereas Pfeiffer's autocratic style would be suited to price and product competition. Rosen initiated a 14-hour board meeting, and the directors also interviewed Pfeiffer for several hours without Canion's knowledge. At the conclusion, the board was unanimous in picking Pfeiffer over Canion.

Canion declined an offer to remain on Compaq's board and was bitter about his ouster as he didn't speak to Rosen for years, although their relationship became cordial again. In 1999, Canion admitted that his ouster was justified, saying "I was burned out. I needed to leave. He [Rosen] felt I didn't have a strong sense of urgency". Two weeks after Canion's ouster, five other senior executives resigned, including remaining company founder James C. Harris as SVP of engineering. These departures were motivated by an enhanced severance or early retirement, as well as an imminent demotion as their functions were to be shifted to vice presidents.

=== Market dominance ===
Under Pfeiffer's tenure as chief executive, Compaq entered the retail computer market with the Presario which made them one of the first manufacturers in the mid-1990s to market a sub-$1000 PC. In order to maintain the prices it wanted, Compaq became the first first-tier computer manufacturer to utilize CPUs from AMD and Cyrix. The two price wars resulting from Compaq's actions ultimately drove numerous competitors from the market, such as Packard Bell, and by 1994 Compaq had overtaken Apple Computer and even surpassed I.B.M. as the top PC manufacturer. Compaq's inventory and gross margins were better than that of its rivals which enabled it wage the price wars.

=== Management shuffle ===
In 1996, despite record sales and profits at Compaq, Pfeiffer initiated a major management shakeup in the senior ranks. Pfeiffer's vision was to move Compaq beyond its main business of manufacturing retail PCs and into the more lucrative business services and solutions that IBM did well at. Earl Mason, hired from Inland Steel effective in May 1996, immediately made an impact as the new CFO. Under Mason's guidance, Compaq utilized its assets more efficiently instead of focusing just on income and profits, which increased Compaq's cash from $700 million to nearly $5 billion in one year. Also Compaq's return on invested capital (after-tax operating profit divided by operating assets) has doubled to 50 percent from 25 percent in that period.

=== Acquisitions ===
Pfeiffer also made several major acquisitions. In 1997, Compaq bought Tandem Computers, known for their NonStop server line. This acquisition instantly gave Compaq a presence in the higher end business computing market. In 1998, Compaq acquired Digital Equipment Corporation, the leading company in the previous generation of computing during the 1970s and early 1980s. This acquisition made Compaq, at the time, the world's second largest computer maker in the world in terms of revenue behind I.B.M.

However, Pfeiffer had little vision for what the combined companies should do, or indeed how the three dramatically different cultures could work as a single entity, and Compaq struggled as a result of a strategy that had the company caught in between the low end and high end of the market. Mark Anderson, president of Strategic News Service, a research firm based in Friday Harbor, Wash. was quoted as saying "The kind of goals he had sounded good to shareholders -- like being a $50 billion company by the year 2000, or to beat I.B.M. -- but they didn't have anything to do with customers. The new C.E.O. should look at everything Eckhard acquired and ask: did the customer benefit from that? If the answer isn't yes, they should get rid of it." On one hand, Compaq struggled to compete in the PC market with the Dell Computer Corporation, which sold directly to buyers, avoiding the dealer channel and its markup, and built each machine to order to keep inventories and costs at a minimum. At the same time, Compaq, though its acquisitions of the Digital Equipment Corporation last year and Tandem Computer in 1997, has tried to become a major systems company, like I.B.M. and Hewlett-Packard.

=== Ouster ===
By summer 1998, Compaq was suffering from product-quality problems. Pfeiffer also refused to develop a potential successor, rebuffing Rosen's suggestion to recruit a few executives to create the position of Compaq president. The board complained that Pfeiffer was too removed from management and the troops, as he surrounded himself with a "clique" of Chief Financial Officer Earl Mason, Senior Vice-president John Rose, and Human Resources Chief Hans Gutsch.

On April 17, 1999, just nine days after Compaq reported first-quarter profit being at half of what analysts had expected, the latest in a string of earnings disappointments, Pfeiffer was forced to resign as CEO in a coup led by board chairman Ben Rosen. Reportedly, at the special board meeting held on April 15, the directors were unanimous in dismissing Pfeiffer. During three out of the last six quarters of Pfeiffer's tenure, the company's revenues or earnings had missed expectations. While rival Dell Computer had 55% growth in U.S. PC sales in the first quarter of 1999, Compaq could only manage 10%. Rosen suggested that the accelerating change brought about by the Internet had overtaken Compaq's management team, saying "As a company engaged in transforming its industry for the Internet era, we must have the organizational flexibility necessary to move at Internet speed." In a statement, Pfeiffer said "Compaq has come a long way since I joined the company in 1983" and "under Ben's guidance, I know this company will realize its potential." Rosen's priority was to have Compaq catchup as an E-commerce competitor, and he also moved to streamline operations and reduce the indecision that plagued the company.

Pfeiffer received $6 million in severance pay, and received $70 million worth of stock options that vested immediately as a result of his forced resignation. At the time of his departure, Pfeiffer held 9.5 million exercisable options valued at nearly $340 million which vested but Pfeiffer had not yet cashed the options.

=== Aftermath ===
Rosen assumed the capacity of interim CEO and began "cleaning house", as shortly afterward many of Pfeiffer's top executives resigned or were pushed out, including John Rando, Earl Mason, and John Rose. Rando, senior vice president and general manager of Compaq Services, had been said to be the heir-apparent to Pfeiffer. His division had performed strongly as it had sales of $1.6 billion for the first quarter compared to $113 million in 1998, which met expectations and was anticipated to post accelerated and profitable growth going forward. CFO Mason, who had previously been offered the job of chief executive of a company outside the personal computer industry, informed Compaq's board that he accepted the offer. Rose, head of Compaq's Enterprise Computing group, was reportedly upset that he was not considered for the CEO vacancy; his division reportedly accounted for one third of Compaq's revenues and likely the largest part of its profits.

Pfeiffer's permanent replacement was Michael Capellas, who had been serving as Compaq's CIO. Immediately after Pfeiffer's ouster, Capellas was elevated to interim chief operating officer by Rosen, and after several months Capellas was made president and CEO, also assuming the title of chairman on September 28, 2000, when Rosen retired from the board of directors. Capellas was able to restore some of the luster lost in the latter part of the Pfeiffer era and he repaired the relationship with Microsoft which had deteriorated under his predecessor's tenure, but the company still struggled against lower-cost competitors such as Dell who took over the top spot of PC manufacturer from Compaq in 2001.

== Post-Compaq activities ==
Pfeiffer was one of the founders of Accoona, an Internet search engine provider, and has been its chairman since December 2004 until Accoona shut down on October 5, 2008.

Pfeiffer served on the boards of several major corporations including Ericsson, and DirecTV.
