= Silicon Cowboys =

2016 American documentary film about Compaq

- Directed by: Jason Cohen
- Written by: Jason Cohen, Steven Leckart
- Based on: Open: How Compaq Ended IBM's PC Domination and Helped Invent Modern Computing by Rod Canion
- Produced by: Ross M. Dinerstein, Glen Zipper
- Cinematography: Svetlana Cvetko
- Edited by: Jake Pushinsky
- Music by: Ian Hultquist
- Distributed by: FilmRise
- Release date: September 16, 2016 (US)
- Running time: 77 minutes
- Country: United States
- Language: English

Silicon Cowboys is a 2016 American documentary film that follows the meteoric rise of Compaq, a personal computer company founded by three Texans in 1982 in the Greater Houston area. The three founders are featured—Rod Canion, Jim Harris and Bill Murto—along with the New York venture capitalist Benjamin M. Rosen who served as chairman. Archival footage and recent interviews combine to tell the story of how Compaq started producing the first portable ("luggable") IBM-compatible computer. The narrative shows how the company faced challenges in the marketplace, growing quickly, and eventually beating industry giant IBM in the PC category: a David-and-Goliath story.

The filmmakers include snippets of the two contemporary TV series—Silicon Valley by HBO and Halt and Catch Fire by AMC—about the PC revolution in California's Silicon Valley and its counterpart technology center in Houston, Texas. Halt and Catch Fire creator Christopher Cantwell gives his impression of Compaq's role, and how the Texans were viewed in California.

Archival footage includes 1980s Compaq television advertisements featuring British comedian John Cleese as well as competing advertisements from IBM with several cast members of M*A*S*H buying PCs in a modern corporate office. Scenes from Compaq's in-house industrial musical stage shows include the Pointer Sisters and Irene Cara performing songs for the employees at various times in the 1980s, and magician David Copperfield appears on stage to promote Compaq products. The documentary describes Microsoft executives Bill Gates and Steve Ballmer as helping Compaq break the stranglehold that IBM had on PC architecture, especially with the threat posed by the IBM PS/2 in 1987, with its proprietary Micro Channel architecture. Compaq is shown joining together with eight other PC manufacturers, known as the Gang of Nine, to establish the Extended Industry Standard Architecture as an alternative to IBM; a strategy that paid off. The film includes archival video of employees talking about the company, and it shows parts of an in-house rap video made by Compaq vice presidents in 1990 to celebrate reaching $1 billion in sales. Director Jason Cohen said that one of the "biggest hurdles" to making the film was finding a working Betamax videotape player for digitizing the industrial video tapes from the 1980s.

The film premiered at SXSW on March 11, 2016. Distributor FilmRise released it on September 16, 2016. Reviews were generally favorable; Metacritic lists a score of 75 out of 100 based on five reviews written in September 2016.
