= Michael Capellas =

American businessman (born 1954)

Michael David Capellas
- Born: August 19, 1954 (age 72)
- Education: Kent State University
- Occupations: Business executive Board member of Cisco
- Known for: Chairman and CEO of VCE; CEO of First Data Corporation; MCI CEO prior to Verizon acquisition Compaq CEO prior to HP acquisition

Michael David Capellas (born August 19, 1954) is an American executive in the computer and telecommunication industries. Capellas was chairman and CEO of First Data Corporation, acting CEO of Serena Software, the last chairman and CEO of Compaq Computer Corporation until its merger with Hewlett-Packard where he became president of the post-merger company briefly, and the last president and CEO of WorldCom (later MCI) where he led its merger with Verizon.

== Early life ==
Capellas claims that he inherited a gritty determination from his father, a Greek citizen who fought with the Greek Army against the Germans in Italy in World War II. After the war, the elder Capellas met and married his wife, Juliet, in Italy. The family then emigrated to Ohio where Capellas' father worked his way up from laborer to superintendent at the Republic Steel Corp. My dad had an unbelievable work ethic. He was intensely loyal to the company. He worked there for 30 years, says Capellas.

As an undergraduate at Kent State University, Capellas developed an interest in computers. Shortly after he graduated with a BBA from Kent State, Capellas met his future wife, Marie Angelillo, a former nurse. The two married in 1979, and for the next 20 years they traveled around the world as Capellas climbed the ranks of each company he joined.

== Business ==
Capellas began his career at Republic Steel. He went on to hold senior executive roles at Schlumberger, Benchmarking Partners, SAP, and Oracle Corporation. Capellas joined Compaq Computer Corporation as CIO in 1998. In 1999, when president and chief executive officer (CEO) Eckhard Pfeiffer was forced to resign after a boardroom coup led by chairman Benjamin M. Rosen, Rosen took on the capacity of interim CEO while Capellas was elevated to COO. Several months later, Capellas became permanent CEO and Chairman of Compaq.

As chairman and CEO of Compaq between 1999 and 2001, Capellas helped repair the relationship between Microsoft and Compaq, which had eroded over the years. His efforts resulted in Compaq becoming Microsoft's key strategic partner for the release of its Windows 2000 operating system.

In 2001, Capellas led Compaq into an acquisition by Hewlett-Packard, but the deal was delayed for eight months because of a proxy and boardroom battle within HP. Finally, on May 3, 2002, Hewlett-Packard announced approval of the acquisition and Capellas became president of the post-merger Hewlett-Packard, under CEO Carly Fiorina, to ease the integration of the two companies. However, Capellas was reported not to be happy with his role, being said not to be utilized and being unlikely to become CEO as the board supported Fiorina. Capellas stepped down on November 12, 2002, just six months on the job. His former role of president was not filled as the executives who reported to him then reported directly to the CEO.

In December 2002, Capellas became the turnaround president and CEO of WorldCom (later MCI). He led a successful restructuring of the organization, one of the largest in corporate history, and stepped down as CEO after MCI's merger with Verizon in 2006.

In December 2006, Capellas was appointed acting CEO of Serena Software, selected by Silver Lake Partners, the company that took Serena private in March 2006 and where Capellas was a senior advisor.

On July 10, 2007, Capellas was identified as the new CEO of First Data Corporation. The position was to become effective upon the completion of the leveraged buyout (LBO) of First Data by private equity firm Kohlberg Kravis Roberts.

In 2010 it was announced he would be chairman and CEO of VCE, a joint venture of Cisco Systems and EMC Corporation with investment from Intel and VMware that specializes in cloud computing. In July 2012 a new president and CEO of VCE replaced Capellas.

Capellas is on the board of directors for Cisco, and was on the national board of the Boys and Girls Clubs of America. In 2001, Capellas was inducted into the Warren, Ohio Schools Distinguished Alumni Hall of Fame.
