= NetWorth =

Defunct American networking hardware company

NetWorth, Inc.
- Type: Public
- Industry: Computer networking
- Founded: January 1985; 41 years ago
- Founders: John McHale; Gabriel Pugliese
- Defunct: December 1995; 30 years ago
- Fate: Acquired by Compaq
- Number of employees: 300 (1995, peak)

NetWorth, Inc. was an American computer networking hardware company active from 1985 to 1995 and based in Irving, Texas. The company manufactured equipment, mainly hubs, for Ethernet-based local area networks (LANs) and wide area networks (WANs) for most of its existence, becoming one of the top players in its field along with companies such as 3Com, SynOptics, and Cabletron. In 1995, Compaq acquired the company for $372 million, absorbing it within their networking products division shortly thereafter.

== History ==
=== Foundation (1985–1986) ===
NetWorth, Inc. was founded in Irving, Texas, in January 1985, by John McHale and Gabriel Pugliese. McHale, the company's primary founder, previously worked for a couple of large Dallas-based computer companies, namely Texas Instruments, where he worked as a design engineer, and Interphase Corporation, where he worked as a product manager for the company's networking division. At Interphase, McHale befriended Pugliese, who also worked in the networking division as a quality control manager. In late 1984, the two decided to found their own startup in the computer networking industry, naming it NetWorth and incorporating it in January 1985. Founded on a minimal budget, NetWorth was originally envisioned as a design consulting firm for existing network hardware manufacturers, but the two soon decided to pivot to marketing their own hardware. Meanwhile, the two continued to work at Interphase, McHale in particular putting in 80-hour workweeks working both jobs.

=== vSERIES (1987–1989) ===
Following the founders' exit from Interphase in 1986, NetWorth finally left stealth mode and announced its first product in June of that year. Called vLAN, it was a network interface controller allowing IBM PCs and compatibles to form a local area network (LAN) over single-pair wiring.

Manufacturing of the vLAN commenced in 1987, after the company received investment from Ray Noorda, then the CEO of Novell, which manufactured the highly popular NetWare network operating system. According to McHale, he and Pugliese discovered that Noorda took calls from his sales staff at the exact same time in the morning and, armed with this knowledge, made repeated cold-calls to Noorda's extension at Novell before he finally relented and flew from Utah to NetWorth's office in Dallas. Impressed with vLAN, Noorda invited the founders to a joint-distribution agreement with Novell while also agreeing to foot the bill for patent and licensing fees associated with developing NetWare products. In June 1987, NetWorth introduced vLAN+, their second product which improved upon the data transfer rates of the original vLAN, and in March 1988, the company introduced vNET Microchannel, a redesign of the vLAN using IBM's proprietary Micro Channel bus, as used in their PS/2 line of personal computer systems (the original vLAN and vLAN+ cards used the more-open ISA bus). vLAN, vLAN+, and vNET altogether comprised the vSERIES.

=== EtherNext (1989–1992) ===
In February 1989, NetWorth announced EtherNext, a family of network interface cards and stackable hubs that made use of the emerging 10BASE-T standard for Ethernet over unshielded twisted pair cables, defined by the IEEE Standards Association. Introduced in June 1989, it was the first commercial product based on the 10BASE-T standard, which at that point in time had yet to be ratified by the IEEE SA. In October 1990, NetWorth introduced EtherNext Series 4000, a network management system comprising software and hardware that maintains and troubleshoots a NetWare-based LAN. The Series 4000 came in two versions: the Network Command Center (CHAS06), a rack-mounted chassis featuring six slots that can hold up to six 12-port 10BASE-T hubs, for a total of 72 ports; and the Departmental Command Center (CHAS03), a shorter rack-mount chassis featuring only three slots accepting the same hubs, for a total of 36 ports. Users can alternatively replace one hub with a Network Management Module, which in tandem with NetWorth's software can detect and diagnose issues and errors with cable wiring and hardware configuration at the level of the IPX protocol.

McHale became the president and CEO of NetWorth in 1989, rising from vice presidency of marketing. Employment increased from 23 workers in February 1990 to 100 in June 1991 to 150 in November 1991. By June 1991, NetWorth had shipped over 85,000 units of their 10BASE-T products. In December 1991, Ungermann-Bass (UB), a pioneering networking company that catered to large businesses, acquired a 50-percent stake in NetWorth, prompting major expansion of the latter. Ungermann-Bass sought partial ownership of NetWorth in order to capture NetWorth's dominance in the low-level Ethernet hub market. By re-marketing NetWorth's Series 4000 hubs, UB could point their small-business clients to their high-end intelligent hubs as their needs grew. As part of the deal, NetWorth also gained the rights to resell some of UB's products, and the two agreed to collaborate on future products. Following UB's purchase, NetWorth moved their headquarters to a 65,000-square-foot office in Dallas near DFW, roughly four times larger in floorplan than their old space, which was closer to downtown. UB were preceded in their stake of NetWorth by Fibermux Corporation, which had purchased a 10-percent stake in NetWorth in 1989 before selling it off shortly thereafter.

=== Expansion and acquisition (1992–1995) ===
NetWorth became a public company after filing its initial public offering on the Nasdaq in November 1992. The company became one of 1992's most promising IPOs after its ticker price rose doubled to $32 on its first trading day. Following the announcement of a quarterly loss in April 1993, the company's stock price dipped 43 percent to $10.75, down $8 in what The Wall Street Journal then called "the latest example of how chasing highly touted IPOs can quickly produce heavy losses".

In 1994, IBM announced a partnership with NetWorth for the latter to act as an OEM for some of IBM's networking products. That same year, NetWorth expanded its manufacturing presence in Dallas by adding a production line for surface-mount PCBs. In 1995, NetWorth made its first and only acquisition, purchasing the networking hardware company Network Resources Corporation (NRC) of San Francisco, California, for $22 million in cash and stock. The company concluded fiscal year 1995 with $55 million in revenues while posting $24 million in losses due to the acquisition of NRC and a failed R&D project, which NetWorth had to write off entirely.

In November 1995, Compaq announced their acquisition of NetWorth for $372 million in a stock swap. Compaq had recently acquired Thomas-Conrad, another networking company based in Austin, Texas, for a rumored $15 million. The acquisition of NetWorth was finalized in December 1995. Compaq absorbed NetWorth's assets, transferring them to their networking products division shortly thereafter while dropping the NetWorth name entirely, as had been done to Thomas-Conrad.

Shortly following the sale of NetWorth, McHale founded another networking start-up, NetSpeed, in February 1996. An early provider of on-premises DSL modems for broadband Internet access, NetSpeed itself was acquired in 1998 by Cisco Systems.
