= L. J. Sevin =

American venture capitalist

Leonce John Sevin Jr.
- Born: August 28, 1930; Baton Rouge, Louisiana, United States
- Died: September 12, 2015 (aged 85)
- Other names: L. J. Sevin Jr
- Occupation: Venture capitalist
- Known for: Co-founder of Mostek and Sevin Rosen Funds
- Spouse: Jo Danna Sevin
- Children: 4

L. J. Sevin, Jr. (August 28, 1930 - September 12, 2015) was an American venture capitalist and co-founder of Mostek. He was also co-founder of Sevin Rosen Funds.

== Early life ==
He was born to Leonce John Sevin, Sr. and Pauline Perkins Sevin in Baton Rouge. He fought in the Korean War and, with funding from the G. I. Bill, attended and graduated from Louisiana State University, with a Bachelor and Master of Science degrees in Electrical Engineering.

In 1965, while working for Texas Instruments he wrote a book, "Field Effect Transistors" that was translated into seven languages.

== Career ==
Sevin co-founded Mostek when, in 1969, he left Texas Instruments; he was the company's CEO for ten years.

With Benjamin M. Rosen, he co-founded Sevin Rosen Funds in 1981.

== Other positions ==
He served on the board at

- Institute of Technology at Southern Methodist University,
- the A. B. Freeman School of Business at Tulane University,
- the Bulova Watch Company
- the Trade Policy Committee of the Semiconductor Industry Association
- Dallas Opera Board of Directors

== Personal life ==
When Sevin died, his family included wife Jo Danna Sevin, daughters Christine Sevin Burke and Paula Sevin Webster Hayes, son Gordon Sevin, two grandchildren and a great-grandchild.

In 1982 daughter JoAnna Sevin "died in an automobile accident."
