= Rod Canion =

American computer scientist and businessman (born 1945)

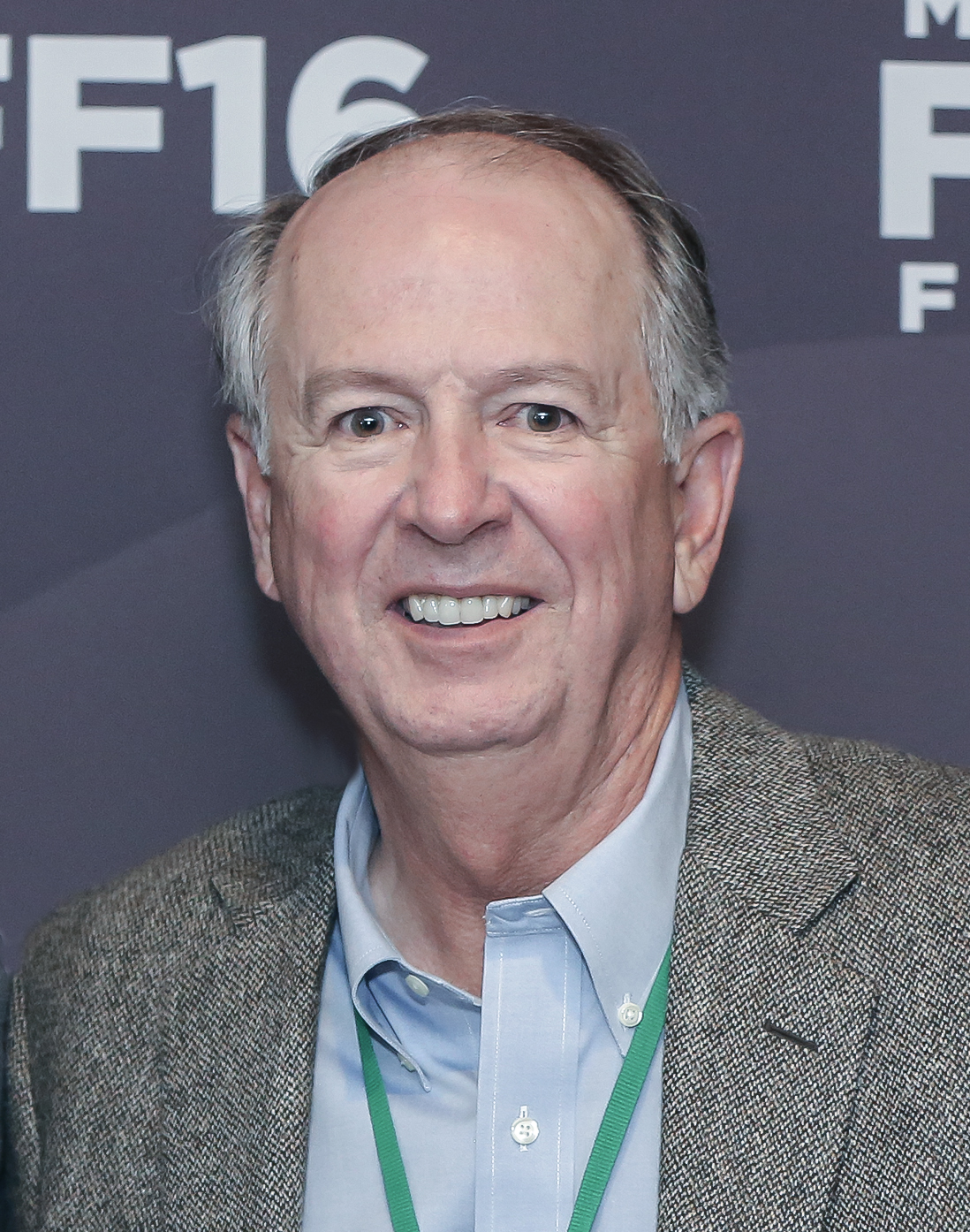
- Rod Canion at the 2016 Montclair Film Festival
- Born: January 19, 1945 (age 81); Houston, Texas
- Education: University of Houston
- Occupation: Co-founder of Compaq Computer Corporation

Joseph Rodney "Rod" Canion (born January 19, 1945) is an American computer scientist and businessman who co-founded Compaq Computer Corporation in 1982 and served as its first president and CEO.

== Biography ==
A native of Houston, Canion graduated from the University of Houston in 1966 and 1968 with bachelor's and master's degrees in electrical engineering with an emphasis on computer science.

Before co-founding Compaq in 1982, Canion, Jim Harris and Bill Murto had been senior managers at Texas Instruments.

=== Compaq ===
The three co-founders received backing from venture capitalist Benjamin M. Rosen, who became chairman of the board of Compaq.

During Canion's tenure as Compaq's CEO, the company set records for the highest first-year sales in the history of American business and reached the Fortune 500 and $1 billion in revenue faster than any other company.

In 1991, after Compaq suffered their first loss as a company, Canion was dismissed by Rosen and succeeded as CEO by Eckhard Pfeiffer, then-COO and former president of Compaq International. Rosen initiated a 14-hour board meeting, and the directors also interviewed Pfeiffer for several hours without informing Canion. At the conclusion, the board was unanimous in picking Pfeiffer over Canion. As Canion was popular with company workers, 150 employees staged an impromptu protest with signs stating "We love you, Rod." and taking out a newspaper ad saying "Rod, you are the wind beneath our wings. We love you." Canion declined an offer to remain on Compaq's board. Two weeks after Canion's ouster, five other senior executives resigned, including remaining company founder James Harris as SVP of Engineering. These departures were motivated by an enhanced severance or early retirement, as well as an imminent demotion as their functions were to be shifted to vice presidents.

=== After leaving Compaq ===
In 1992, Canion founded Insource Technology Group with Jim Harris and Ronald L. Fischer and served as its chairman until September 2006. In 1999, he led the initial investment round for Questia Media, Inc., which provided an online research library until its closure in 2020. Canion became chairman of the board and later helped the company raise $150 million. He is a member of the Board of Directors of AMVESCAP, BlueArc, and Young Life, and HealthLink, is Director Emeritus of the Houston Technology Center, and is a member of the Board of Advisors for Sternhill Partners.

In 2013, Canion published a memoir titled Open about his career in Compaq, how the IBM PC compatible industry began with the Compaq Portable and eventually outgrew IBM, and how Canion created the Extended Industry Standard Architecture bus along with the Gang of Nine in 1988. In 2016, the documentary film Silicon Cowboys described the rise of Compaq as seen through the eyes of Canion, his colleagues and his competitors. The film was based on his memoir.

== Publications ==
- Open: How Compaq Ended IBM's PC Domination and Helped Invent Modern Computing. BenBella Books. 2013. ISBN 978-1937856991.
