= Sevin Rosen Funds =

American venture capital firm

Sevin Rosen Funds (SRF)
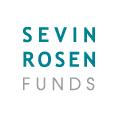
- Type: Private
- Industry: early stage venture capital
- Founded: Dallas (1981)
- Founders: L. J. Sevin; Benjamin M. Rosen
- Fate: Winding-up after not raising a new fund for 16+ years
- Headquarters: Dallas, Texas
- Key people: John Bayless; Steve Domenik; John Jaggers
- Website: www.srfunds.com

Sevin Rosen Funds (SRF) is a Texas-based venture capital firm credited with pioneering the personal computing revolution in the 1980s and also venture investing in Dallas. It was established in 1981 by L. J. Sevin, a former Texas Instruments engineer, and Ben Rosen, and was one of the leading investors on the US West Coast.

== Investments ==
Before starting Sevin Rosen, Ben Rosen had been a technology analyst at Morgan Stanley, whose conflict of interest rules prevented him from investing in the companies he was evangelizing, such as Apple. After leaving Morgan Stanley, he started investing; most successfully a $20,000 stake in VisiCorp, the inventor of the spreadsheet. He later sold his VisiCorp stock for $800,000, eight months after Sevin Rosen invested in Lotus, the competitor that destroyed VisiCalc. In 1980, he teamed up with L. J. Sevin, who had co-founded the Mostek semiconductor company and sold it for $345 million. First, the pair attempted to start a new semiconductor company, and when that didn't work out, they raised $25 million for SRF's first two venture funds with help from Thomas Unterberg. Those first two funds generated annual compounded return on investment of 75% for the few years, thanks primarily to early investments in Compaq and Lotus. Jon Bayless joined the firm in 1981, and several of the subsequent funds included his name.

Since 1995, the firm invested in 542 ventures and created billions of dollars for its investors. Investments include Alder Biopharmaceuticals, Capstone Turbine, Ciena, Citrix Systems, Compaq, Cyrix, Cytokinetics, Electronic Arts, NetLogic Microsystems, Silicon Graphics, MetaCarta, Splunk, Cypress Semiconductor, Ciena Corporation, Vitesse Semiconductor, Slacker, Wayport, XenSource, YouSendIt.

As of April 2003, the firm had raised eight funds and reported having nine general partners, thirty-five employees, offices in Dallas and Palo Alto, and $1.6 billion under management with more than $1 billion invested. The firm continued to focus on semiconductors, software, and telecommunications and mentioned Westbridge Technology, NetLogic Microsystems, and Cicada Semiconductor as examples. Steve Domenik said, "we look for [technologies] that are a little harder," take longer to start up, and have less clear focus. "We take a lot of technical risk," Domenik said, and prefer to be the first investors in a company.

=== Controversy: Funds IX & X ===
SRF raised $305 million in its Fund IX in 2004. At the time of raising Fund IX, John Jaggers said, "We believe that limiting investment in venture capital over the next few years, both at the portfolio company level and at the fund level, will be critical to generating superior returns for the venture industry. Our firm is very concerned that there continues to be far too much capital in the venture industry..." By October 2006, it had invested less than 20% of Fund IX, and took the unprecedented step of returning more than $200 million in commitments to the Fund X that it had been raising.

In October 2006, SRF's partner Steve Dow made a statement to the New York Times, "The traditional venture model seems to us to be broken," that sparked intense discussion throughout the venture industry about whether too much money was chasing too few deals. While some agreed, others asserted that SRF had failed to adapt to changing markets. At the time, other firms said SRF had failed to adapt to changing markets and pointed out that none of its partners were under 40.

In 2008, the firm’s California-based partners Steve Dow, Nick Sturiale, John Oxaal and Steve Domenik split from their Dallas partners were listed on the firm’s website as "partners emeriti."

As of 2014, the Boston Business Journal reported that Jon Bayless "hopes to raise up to $150 million for what would be Sevin Rosen’s first new fund in eight years." By 2018, the firm's website listed eleven people, six of whom have either retired or joined or launched other VC funds, including Workhorse Capital Ignition Capital, and CIC Partners. A few of the partners still list SRF as "present" on LinkedIn profiles. However, even Jon Bayless lists a second fund called Bayless Capital above SRF.

== Offices ==
Sevin Rosen's Dallas office on the 16th floor of Two Galleria Tower was a hotspot for startups and investors. It leased space to other VC firms and had the largest concentration of venture capital firms in the region until Sevin Rosen downsized and moved out in late 2009. The fund shut down its Silicon Valley office in Palo Alto in 2008.

== Community ==
The company founded and funded an award that gives recognition to "innovative technical achievement with potential for entrepreneurial success" at Berkeley and a grant for "membership in Austin Technology Incubator."
