= NetSpeed =

American broadband internet access company

- Type: Division
- Industry: Computer networking
- Founded: United States
- Founder: John McHale
- Fate: Acquired by Cisco Systems
- Headquarters: United States
- Parent: Cisco Systems

NetSpeed was a broadband Internet access company based in the United States. It was acquired by Cisco Systems on March 10, 1998. NetSpeed's DSL products were the first service provider and customer-premises DSL equipment to be production deployed at a major U.S. service provider, US West.

The founder of NetSpeed, John McHale, also started NetWorth, Inc., a manufacturer of 10BASE-T Ethernet equipment in 1989. The company was acquired by Compaq in 1994. After NetSpeed, Inc., John McHale went on to found NetPliance, TippingPoint, and BreakingPoint Systems. Key employees of NetSpeed also went on to found other companies.

Kip McClanahan and Kenny VanZant went on to found BroadJump after the Cisco acquisition in 1998. Brendon Mills, Paul Carew, Ron Lutz, and Steve Raich went on to found General Bandwidth (now GenBand, Inc), in 1999. Cliff Hall and Bob Locklear were founding members of Surgient Networks in 2000, and Jim Johnson founded UControl in 2005.
