= Jim Harris (entrepreneur) =

American businessman

James M. Harris is an American businessman, who, along with Rod Canion and Bill Murto, founded Compaq Computer Corporation. He resigned from the company in 1991. He talks about his role in the 2016 documentary film Silicon Cowboys.
