= Benjamin M. Rosen =

American businessman (1933–2026)

- Born: March 11, 1933; New Orleans, Louisiana, U.S.
- Died: August 23, 2026 (aged 93); New York City, U.S.
- Education: California Institute of Technology (B.S.); Stanford University (M.S.); Columbia University (M.B.A.)
- Known for: Chairman of Compaq

Benjamin Maurice Rosen (March 11, 1933 – August 23, 2026) was an American businessman who was the chairman and acting chief executive officer of Compaq, and a co-founder of Sevin Rosen Funds.

== Early life ==
Rosen was born to a Jewish family in New Orleans, Louisiana, on March 11, 1933, to Isadore and Anna Rosen. Rosen's father was a dentist and his mother was a secretary. Benji, as he was called, was the youngest of their three children.

He received a B.S. from the California Institute of Technology in 1954, an M.S. from Stanford University in 1955, and an M.B.A. from Columbia Business School in 1961.

== Career ==
Rosen worked on Wall Street for 15 years, ending his career as a Senior Technology Analyst and Vice President at Morgan Stanley.

=== Sevin Rosen Funds ===
Rosen co-founded the venture capital company Sevin Rosen Funds in 1981 with L. J. Sevin. In this capacity, Rosen invested in Compaq Computer Corporation in 1981, eventually serving as Chairman for 18 years. For four months in 1999, Rosen also served as Acting CEO. Rosen talks about his experience with Compaq in the 2016 documentary film Silicon Cowboys.

As a financier, Rosen backed high tech startup companies including Electronic Arts, Lotus Development, Ansa Software and Silicon Graphics.

In 1985, at age 52, he was described as "a late bloomer who has had five careers" and "chairman and general partner" of the fund.

=== Rosen Electronic Letter ===
Rosen Electronic Letter was distributed via a separate entity named Rosen Research. In 1982, Esther Dyson began working there and, in 1983 she bought the company from her employer, renaming the company EDventure Holdings and the Rosen Electronic Letter newsletter Release 1.0.

== Philanthropy ==
Rosen served on the Board of Trustees at Memorial Sloan Kettering Cancer Center, the New York Philharmonic, and on the Director's Roundtable at the Morgan Library & Museum.

== Personal life and death ==
Rosen and his first wife, Alexandra, had two sons, Jeffrey Rosen and Eric Rosen. He later married Donna Perret and had a step-daughter, Melanie Perret.

Rosen died in Manhattan on August 23, 2026, at the age of 93.

== Awards ==
In 1999, Rosen was awarded the Founders Medal of the Institute of Electrical and Electronics Engineers (IEEE). He was named a recipient of Caltech's Distinguished Alumni Award in 2007. In 2018, he received Caltech's highest honor, the Robert A. Millikan Medal.
