= History of IBM =

Logos of IBM
1924–1946
1947–1956
1956–1972
Since 1972

International Business Machines Corporation (IBM) is a multinational corporation specializing in computer technology and information technology consulting. Headquartered in Armonk, New York, the company originated from the amalgamation of various enterprises dedicated to automating routine business transactions, notably pioneering punched card-based data tabulating machines and time clocks. In 1911, these entities were unified under the umbrella of the Computing-Tabulating-Recording Company (CTR).

Thomas J. Watson (1874–1956) assumed the role of general manager within the company in 1914 and ascended to the position of President in 1915. By 1924, the company rebranded as "International Business Machines". IBM diversified its offerings to include electric typewriters and other office equipment. Watson, a proficient salesman, aimed to cultivate a highly motivated, well-compensated sales force capable of devising solutions for clients unacquainted with the latest technological advancements.

In the 1940s and 1950s, IBM began its initial forays into computing, which constituted incremental improvements to the prevailing card-based system. A pivotal moment arrived in the 1960s with the introduction of the System/360 family of mainframe computers. IBM provided a comprehensive spectrum of hardware, software, and service agreements, fostering client loyalty and solidifying its moniker "Big Blue". The customized nature of end-user software, tailored by in-house programmers for a specific brand of computers, deterred brand switching due to its associated costs. Despite challenges posed by clone makers like Amdahl and legal confrontations, IBM leveraged its esteemed reputation, assuring clients with both hardware and system software solutions, earning acclaim as one of the esteemed American corporations during the 1970s and 1980s.

However, IBM encountered difficulties in the late 1980s and 1990s, marked by substantial losses surpassing $8 billion in 1993. The mainframe-centric corporation grappled with adapting swiftly to the burgeoning Unix open systems and personal computer revolutions. Desktop machines and Unix midrange computers emerged as cost-effective and easily manageable alternatives, overshadowing multi-million-dollar mainframes. IBM responded by introducing a Unix line and a range of personal computers. The competitive edge was gradually lost to clone manufacturers who offered cost-effective alternatives, while chip manufacturers like Intel and software corporations like Microsoft reaped significant profits.

Through a series of strategic reorganizations, IBM managed to sustain its status as one of the world's largest computer companies and systems integrators. As of 2014, the company boasted a workforce exceeding 400,000 employees globally and held the distinction of possessing the highest number of patents among U.S.-based technology firms. IBM maintained a robust presence with research laboratories dispersed across twelve locations worldwide. Its extensive network comprised scientists, engineers, consultants, and sales professionals spanning over 175 countries. IBM employees were recognized for their outstanding contributions with numerous accolades, including five Nobel Prizes, four Turing Awards, five National Medals of Technology, and five National Medals of Science.

== 1880s–1924: The origin of IBM ==
Year	Gross income (in $m)	Employees
1915	4	1,672
1920	14	2,731
1925	13	3,698

IBM traces its roots to the 1880s through the consolidation of four predecessor companies:

1. Bundy Manufacturing Company:
  - Founded in 1889 by Harlow Bundy in Binghamton, New York, as the first manufacturer of time clocks.
2. Tabulating Machine Company:
  - Initiated by Herman Hollerith, who began building punch card-based data processing machines as early as 1884.
  - Founded the Tabulating Machine Company in 1896 in Washington, D.C.
3. International Time Recording Company:
  - Founded in 1900 by George Winthrop Fairchild in Jersey City, New Jersey, and reincorporated in 1901 in Binghamton, later relocating to Endicott, New York in 1906.
4. Computing Scale Company of America:
  - Established in 1901 in Dayton, Ohio.

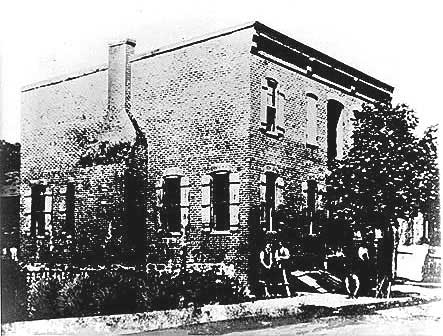
Hollerith's plant in 1893

The U.S. Census Bureau contracted to use Herman Hollerith's punched card tabulating technology on the 1890 United States census. That census was completed in 6-years and estimated to have saved the government $5 million. The total population of 62,947,714, the family, or rough, count, was announced after only six weeks of processing (punched cards were not used for this tabulation). Hollerith's punched cards become the tabulating industry standard for input for the next 70 years, and were initially sold as The Tabulating Machine Company. In 1906, Hollerith made the first tabulator with an automatic card feed and control panel. Hollerith later expanded to private businesses in the United States and abroad. In 1911, due to declining health, Hollerith sold the business to financier Charles Flint for $2.3 million.

On June 16, 1911, Flint merged the four companies into a new holding company named the Computing-Tabulating-Recording Company (CTR), headquartered in Endicott. The consolidation aimed to diversify the company's revenue sources and mitigate risks associated with dependence on a single industry. The consolidated entity initially had 1,300 employees and offices/plants in several locations across the United States and Toronto, Ontario. The amalgamated companies started manufacturing, and selling or leasing machinery such as commercial scales, industrial time recorders, meat and cheese slicers, tabulators, and punched cards. The individual companies continued operating under their established names as subsidiaries of CTR until the holding company was dissolved in 1933.

To strengthen the management of CTR, Flint recruited Thomas J. Watson Sr., formerly general sales manager of the National Cash Register Company (NCR). Watson joined CTR as general manager on May 1, 1914. While at NCR, Watson had been convicted with other company executives in a federal antitrust case; the conviction was subsequently overturned on appeal in 1915. He became president of CTR Monday, March 15, 1915. Watson's managerial strategies and emphasis on customer service and large-scale tabulating solutions propelled revenue growth and expanded the company's operations globally.

In 1916, CTR started investing in its subsidiary's employees, creating an education program. Over the next two decades, the program expanded to include management education, volunteer study clubs, and the construction of the IBM Schoolhouse in 1933. In 1917, CTR expanded to Brazil, invited by the Brazilian Government to conduct the census. In 1920, the Tabulating Machine Co. made their printing tabulator. With prior tabulators the results were displayed and had to be copied by hand. In 1923, CTR acquired majority ownership of the German tabulating firm Deutsche Hollerith Maschinen Groupe (Dehomag).

Watson had never liked the hyphenated title of Computing-Tabulating-Recording Company and chose the new name of "International Business Machines Corporation" (IBM) both for its aspirations and to escape the confines of "office appliance". The new name was first used for the company's Canadian subsidiary in 1917, and was formally changed on February 14, 1924. The subsidiaries' names did not change; there would be no IBM labeled products until 1933 (below) when the subsidiaries are merged into IBM. Under Watson's leadership, he established key initiatives that shaped IBM's organizational culture, including hiring disabled workers, promoting employee education, and fostering a culture of thinking ("THINK" was a slogan made in 1915). His Open Door Policy and initiatives to support employees and their families became integral aspects of IBM's culture.

== 1925–1929: IBM's early growth ==
Our products are known in every zone. Our reputation sparkles like a gem. We've fought our way through and new fields we're sure to conquer too. For the ever-onward IBM

— "Ever Onward", IBM employee songbook

Year	Gross income (in $m)	Employees
1925	13	3,698

Thomas J. Watson, during his tenure at IBM, implemented strict guidelines for employees, encompassing a dress code stipulating dark suits, white shirts, and striped ties. The consumption of alcohol, whether during working hours or otherwise, was prohibited. Watson actively led singing sessions during meetings, featuring songs such as "Ever Onward" from the official IBM songbook. Additionally, the company initiated the publication of an employee newspaper named Business Machines, consolidating coverage of all IBM businesses into one publication.

Several employee recognition programs were introduced, including the Quarter Century Club to honor those with 25 years of service and the Hundred Percent Club to reward sales personnel meeting annual quotas. In 1928, IBM launched the Suggestion Plan program, providing cash rewards to employees for valuable ideas aimed at improving IBM products and procedures. Over a span of 70 years, IBM and its predecessor companies specialized in manufacturing clocks and other time recording products, culminating in the 1958 sale of the IBM Time Equipment Division to Simplex Time Recorder Company. This division produced a range of equipment, including dial recorders, job recorders, recording door locks, time stamps, and traffic recorders.

IBM expanded its product line through innovative engineering, driven by notable inventors such as James W. Bryce, Clair Lake, Fred Carroll, and Royden Pierce. Significant product innovations were introduced, including the first complete school time control system and the first printing tabulator in 1920. In 1923, the company pioneered the first electric keypunch. The Carroll Rotary Press introduced in 1924 revolutionized the production of punched cards by achieving record-setting speeds. In 1928, IBM introduced the 80-column punched card, known as the "IBM Card", effectively doubling its information capacity. This format became an industry standard until the 1970s.

Key events in IBM's history during this period include the first tabulator sold to Japan in 1925, through a partnership with Morimura-Brothers. IBM established its presence in Italy by opening its first office in Milan in 1927, facilitating operations with national insurance and banks. A significant advancement in tabulator technology occurred in 1928 with the introduction of the Hollerith Type IV tabulator capable of subtraction. This year also marked the debut of the Hollerith 80-column punched card, a format that became an industry standard, superseding the prior 45-column card and eventually ending vendor compatibility.

== 1930–1938: The Great Depression ==
Year	Gross income (in $m)	Employees
1930	19	6,346
1935	21	8,654

The 1930s Great Depression posed an extraordinary economic test, yet IBM displayed resilience by maintaining investments in personnel, manufacturing, and technological advancements during this challenging period. Rather than downsizing its workforce, Watson opted to hire additional salesmen and engineers in alignment with President Franklin Roosevelt's National Recovery Administration plan.

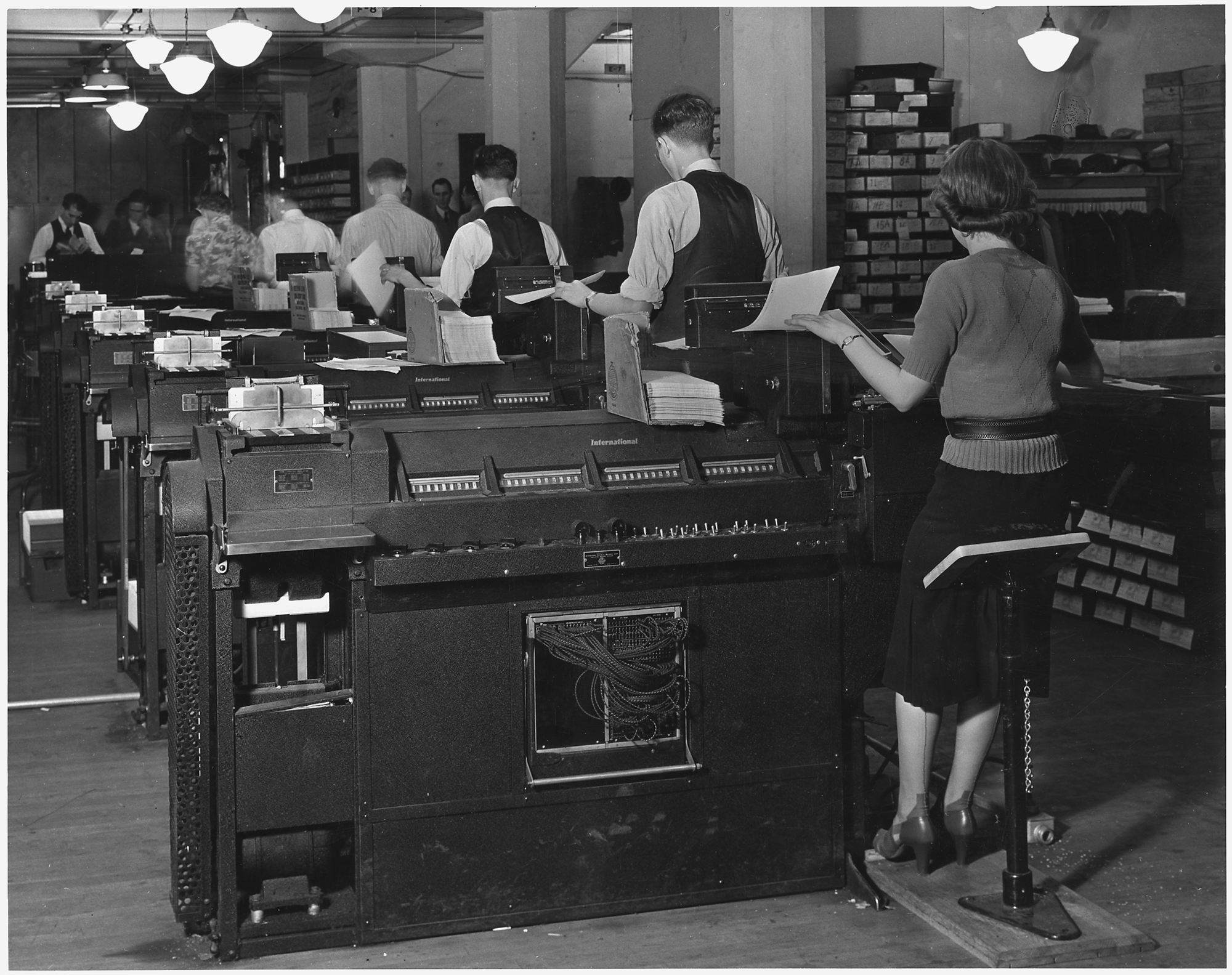
IBM accounting machines in operation at the U.S. Social Security Administration c. 1936

During this era, IBM emerged as a pioneering corporation by instituting employee benefits such as group life insurance (1934), survivor benefits (1935), and paid vacations (1936). The company furthered its commitment to education and research by establishing the IBM Schoolhouse in Endicott and constructing a modern research laboratory at the same location. Watson's strategic decisions during this time represented IBM's initial 'Bet the Company' gamble, marked by substantial internal investments to secure the future.

In an effort to manage the strain on resources caused by factories running at maximum capacity for six years without a market to sell to, IBM opted to sell the struggling Dayton Scale Division (food services equipment business) to Hobart Manufacturing in 1933. An opportune moment arrived with the enactment of the Social Security Act of 1935, hailed as "the biggest accounting operation of all time", wherein IBM secured the exclusive bid by promptly providing the necessary equipment. This landmark government contract involved maintaining employment records for 26 million individuals, propelling IBM's success and paving the way for additional government orders. By the decade's end, IBM had not only navigated through the Depression but had also ascended to a prominent position in the industry.

Watson's visionary focus on international expansion emerged as a pivotal aspect of IBM's 20th-century growth and triumph. Influenced by the devastating impact of World War I on society and businesses, he advocated for commerce as a deterrent to war, emphasizing the compatibility of business interests and peace. Watson's belief was so strong that he inscribed his slogan "World Peace Through World Trade" on the façade of IBM's new World Headquarters (1938) in New York City. This phrase became a fundamental IBM business tenet, and Watson actively campaigned for this idea with international business and government leaders. He played a role as an informal government host to visiting world leaders in New York and received numerous awards from foreign governments in recognition of his efforts to enhance international relations through the establishment of business connections.

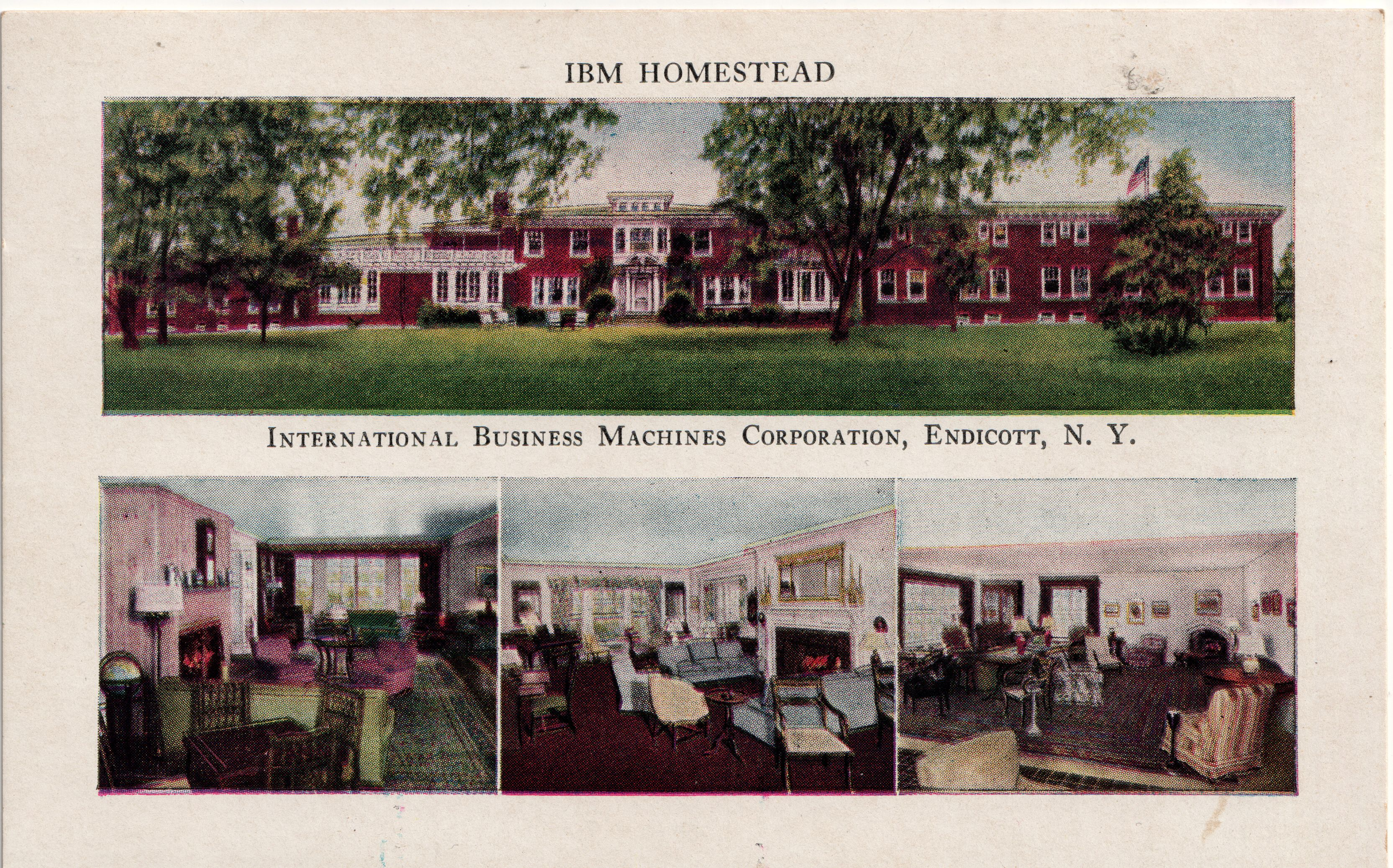
IBM Homestead in Endicott, NY, circa 1930s

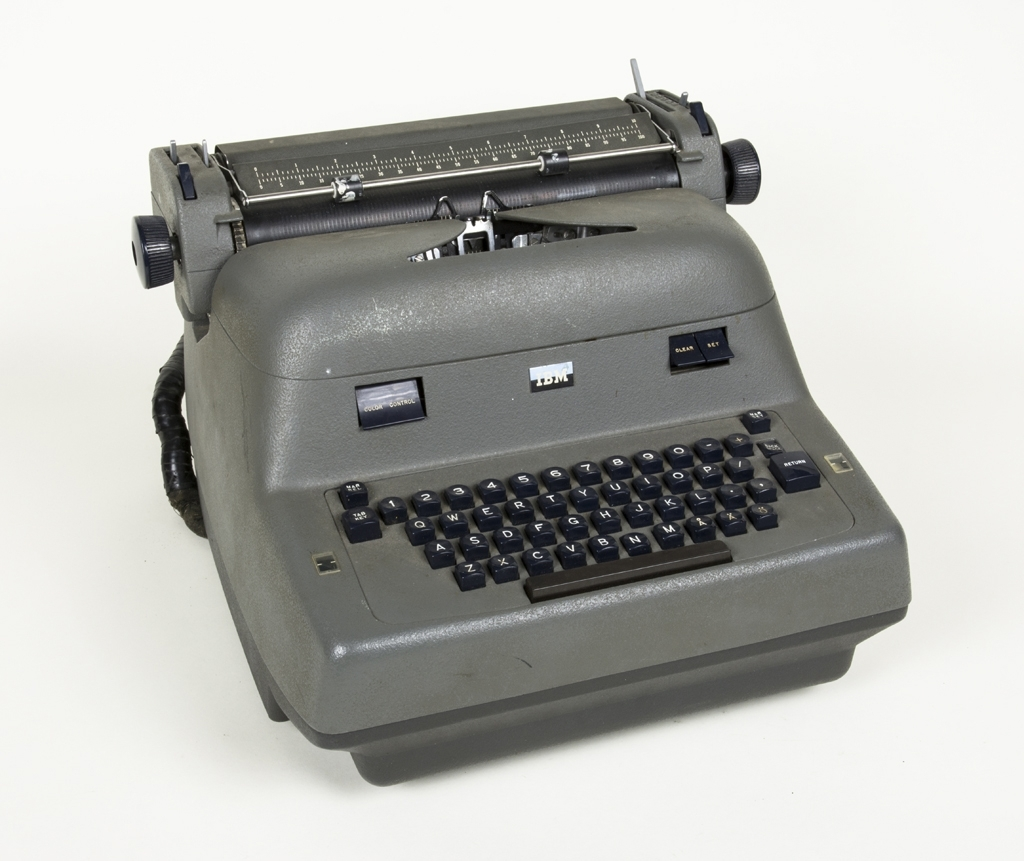
An IBM Model A typewriter

In 1936, following a loss at the US Supreme Court, IBM agreed to a consent decree which created a separate market for the punched cards and in effect for subsequent computer supplies such as magnetic tapes and disk packs.

=== Key events ===
==== 1931 ====
- The first Hollerith punched card machine capable of multiplication is introduced, known as the Hollerith 600 Multiplying Punch.
- The first Hollerith alphabetical accounting machine, the Alphabetic Tabulator Model B, was swiftly followed by the full alphabet ATC.
- The New York World newspaper coins the term "Super Computing Machine" to describe the Columbia Difference Tabulator, a specialized tabulator-based machine created for the Columbia Statistical Bureau. It was exceptionally massive and earned the nickname "Packard". Institutions such as the Carnegie Foundation, Yale University, Harvard University, and others became users.

==== 1933 ====
- Subsidiary companies merge into IBM, leading to the disappearance of names like the Tabulating Machine Company.
- IBM introduces removable control panels.
- IBM implements a standard 40-hour work week for both manufacturing and office locations.
- IBM purchases the Electromatic Typewriter Co., primarily to secure essential patents. Electric typewriters later become one of IBM's prominent products.

==== 1934 ====
- IBM establishes a group life insurance plan for all employees with at least one year of service.
- Watson Sr. transitions IBM's factory employees to a salary-based payment system, eliminating piece work and enhancing economic stability for employees and their families.
- IBM introduces the IBM 801 Bank Proof machine, a new type of proof machine that improved the efficiency of the check clearing process.

==== 1935 ====
- During the Great Depression, IBM maintains production of new machines, positioning the company to win a significant government contract related to the Social Security Act, termed "the biggest accounting operation of all time".

==== 1936 ====
- IBM agreed to 1936 consent decree.

==== 1937 ====
- IBM establishes a tabulating machine data center at Columbia University, known as the Thomas J. Watson Astronomical Computing Bureau, dedicated to scientific research.
- IBM introduces the first collator, the IBM 077 Collator.
- IBM produces five to ten million punched cards every day, employing 32 presses in Endicott, N.Y., for this purpose.
- Rey Johnson of IBM designs the IBM 805 Test Scoring Machine, revolutionizing the test scoring process with innovative pencil-mark sensing technology and the phrase, "Please completely fill in the oval."
- Watson Sr., as president of the International Chamber of Commerce, presides over the ICC's 9th Congress in Berlin and received a Merit Cross of the German Eagle with Star medal from the Nazi government, later returned.
- IBM announces a policy of paying employees for six annual holidays, marking one of the first instances of holiday pay in U.S. companies. Paid vacations also commenced.
- Japan Wattoson Statistics Accounting Machinery Co., Ltd. (now IBM Japan) is established.

==== 1938 ====
- IBM dedicates its new World Headquarters at 590 Madison Avenue, New York City, and by that time, the company had operations in 79 countries.

== 1939–1945: World War II ==
Year	Gross income (in $m)	Employees
1940	45	12,656
1945	138	18,257

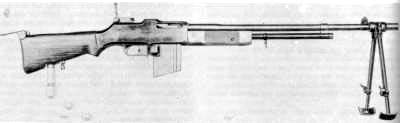
Browning Automatic Rifle

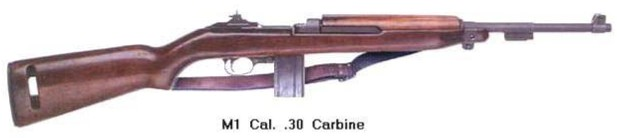
M1 Carbine

In the years preceding the commencement of World War II, the International Business Machines Corporation (IBM) had established operational presences across various nations that later became embroiled in the global conflict, aligning with either the Allies or the Axis powers. IBM maintained the financially significant subsidiary, DEHOMAG, in Germany, where it held a majority ownership stake (from 1922 to 1949), alongside operations in Poland, Switzerland, and several other European countries. In line with the fate of numerous enterprises under enemy ownership in Axis-controlled territories, these IBM subsidiaries were seized by the Nazi regime and other Axis-affiliated governments early in the war. Concurrently, the corporation's central headquarters in New York redirected its efforts towards supporting the American war endeavor.

=== IBM in America ===
During World War II, IBM underwent a significant transformation in its product line and operations to support the war effort. Originally known for its tabulating equipment and time recording devices, IBM shifted its focus to manufacturing various military ordnance items and essential products. The product line expanded to include Sperry and Norden bombsights, Browning Automatic Rifles, the M1 Carbine, and engine parts, comprising over three dozen major ordnance items and 70 products overall. Thomas J. Watson, the president of IBM at the time, set a nominal one percent profit on these war-related products. The profits generated were used to establish a fund dedicated to assisting the widows and orphans of IBM employee war casualties.

The contributions of IBM during this period were instrumental in aiding Allied military forces. The company's tabulating equipment found extensive use in mobile records units, ballistics, accounting, logistics, and other war-related purposes. Particularly notable was the use of IBM punched-card machines at Los Alamos National Laboratory in the Manhattan Project for speeding up calculations necessary for the development of the first atomic bombs.

IBM also played a vital role in technological advancements during the war. In collaboration with the U.S. Navy, IBM built the Automatic Sequence Controlled Calculator, also known as the Harvard Mark I, which was the first large-scale electromechanical calculator in the United States.

In the early 1930s, IBM had acquired the rights to Radiotype, an electric typewriter attached to a radio transmitter. This technology proved to be crucial during the war, as Admiral Richard E. Byrd successfully sent a test Radiotype message over 11,000 miles from Antarctica to an IBM receiving station in Ridgewood, New Jersey in 1935. During the war, Radiotype installations were extensively used, processing up to 50,000,000 words a day, and were selected by the Signal Corps for war-related communications.

To meet the demands of wartime production, IBM significantly expanded its manufacturing capacity. New buildings were constructed at its Endicott, New York plant in 1941, and new facilities were established in Poughkeepsie, New York (1941), Washington, D.C. (1942), and San Jose, California (1943). The decision to establish a presence on the West Coast, particularly in San Jose, was strategic and capitalized on the burgeoning electronics research and high technology innovation base in the region, which later became known as Silicon Valley.

Additionally, IBM was subcontracted by the U.S. government for a critical project related to the Japanese internment camps. IBM provided punched card equipment and services for the administration and management of these camps.

IBM's punched card equipment also played a vital role in code breaking and cryptanalysis efforts by various U.S. Army and Navy organizations, including Arlington Hall, OP-20-G, Central Bureau, Far East Combined Bureau, and similar Allied organizations. These efforts were essential for intelligence and information decryption during the war.

=== IBM in Germany and Nazi-occupied Europe ===
During the 1930s and throughout World War II, the Nazi regime extensively utilized Hollerith punch-card equipment, a technology developed by IBM, for various administrative and discriminatory purposes. IBM's majority-owned German subsidiary, Deutsche Hollerith Maschinen GmbH (Dehomag), played a crucial role in supplying and maintaining this equipment for the Nazis. The machinery facilitated the categorization and identification of individuals in Germany and territories under Nazi control, aiding in the execution of oppressive policies, particularly the persecution and deportation of Jews and other targeted groups during the Holocaust, leading to their internment in Nazi concentration camps.

Dehomag, like numerous foreign-owned enterprises operating in Germany during that era, fell under Nazi control prior to and during World War II. An individual associated with the Nazi regime, Hermann Fellinger, assumed a prominent role within the subsidiary as an enemy-property custodian appointed by the Germans. The control over Dehomag was asserted by the Nazis, although Edwin Black, a journalist and historian, contends in IBM and the Holocaust that the appearance of seizure was a deceptive maneuver. He asserts that the company was not plundered, its leased machinery was not confiscated, and IBM continued to receive funds through its Geneva-based subsidiary. Black argues that IBM persisted in its business relations with the Nazi regime beyond the point where they should have ceased, maintaining and expanding services to the Third Reich, until the United States declared war against Germany in 1941, at which point Germany took control of Dehomag and appointed Hermann Fellinger as enemy-property custodian. IBM countered these claims by stating that the allegations were based on known facts and previously disclosed documents, asserting the absence of new revelations. The company further denied any withholding of relevant documentation. Notable historians have expressed varying views on IBM's complicity and awareness of Nazi utilization of tabulating machines as asserted by Black.

In parallel to these events during World War II, key developments within IBM included initiatives beyond the geopolitical context of the war. Noteworthy events included IBM's launch of a program in 1942 to train and employ disabled individuals, beginning in Topeka, Kansas, and expanding to New York City the following year. Also in 1943, IBM appointed its first female vice president, marking a significant milestone. In the realm of technology, IBM introduced the world's first large-scale calculating computer, the Automatic Sequence Control Calculator (ASCC), in 1944, developed in collaboration with Harvard University. This electromechanical machine, also known as the Mark I, revolutionized calculation speed. Moreover, during 1944, IBM actively participated in supporting education through its involvement with the United Negro College Fund(UNCF). Following the war, in 1945, IBM established its first research facility, the Watson Scientific Computing Laboratory, signifying a pivotal step in the evolution of the company's research endeavors. In 1961, IBM relocated its research headquarters to the T.J. Watson Research Center in Yorktown Heights, New York.

== 1946–1959: Postwar ==
Year	Gross income (in $m)	Employees
1950	266	30,261
1955	696	56,297
1960	1,810	104,241

IBM experienced significant growth in the aftermath of World War II. The company anticipated potential challenges due to a potential decrease in military spending after the war. To address this concern, IBM initiated an ambitious international expansion, leading to the establishment of the World Trade Corporation in 1949, tasked with managing and expanding foreign operations. Under the leadership of Arthur K. 'Dick' Watson, the youngest son of Watson Sr., the World Trade Corporation played a crucial role in contributing to half of IBM's profits by the 1970s.

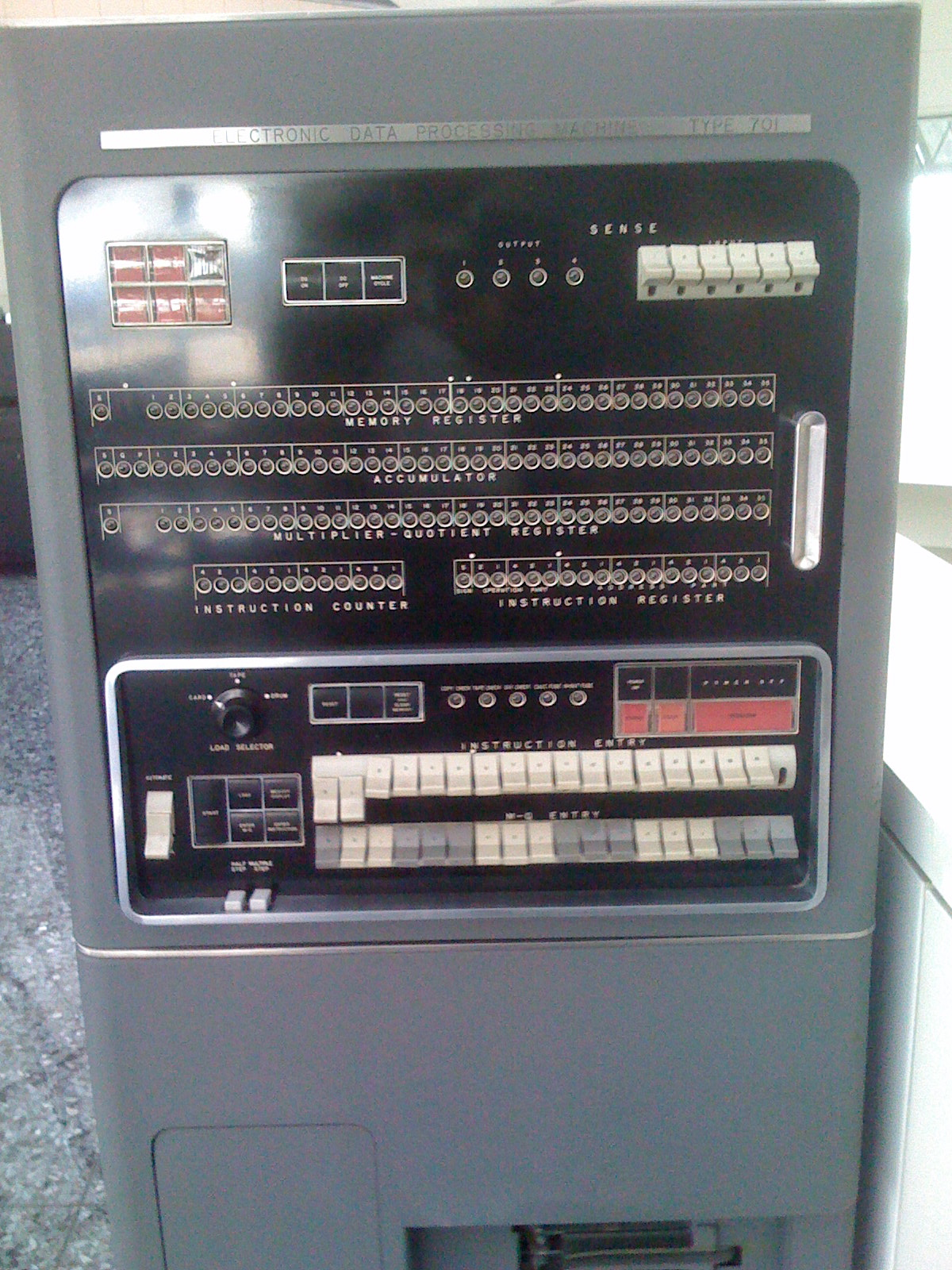
An IBM 701 Electronic Data Processing Machine.

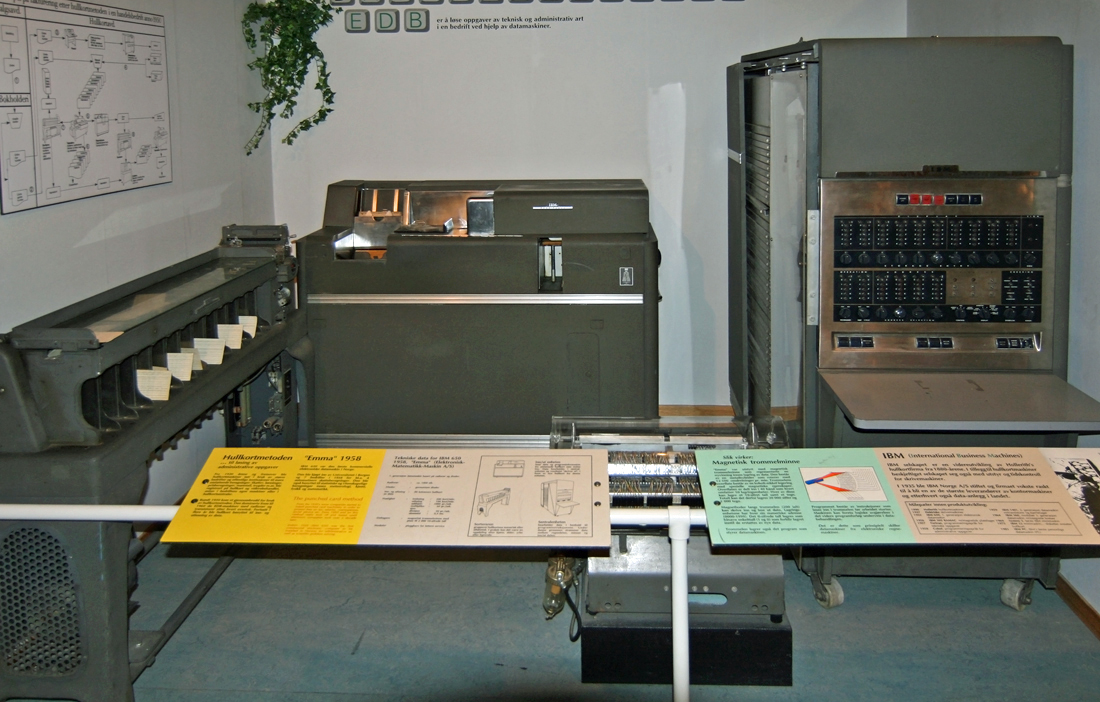
An IBM 650

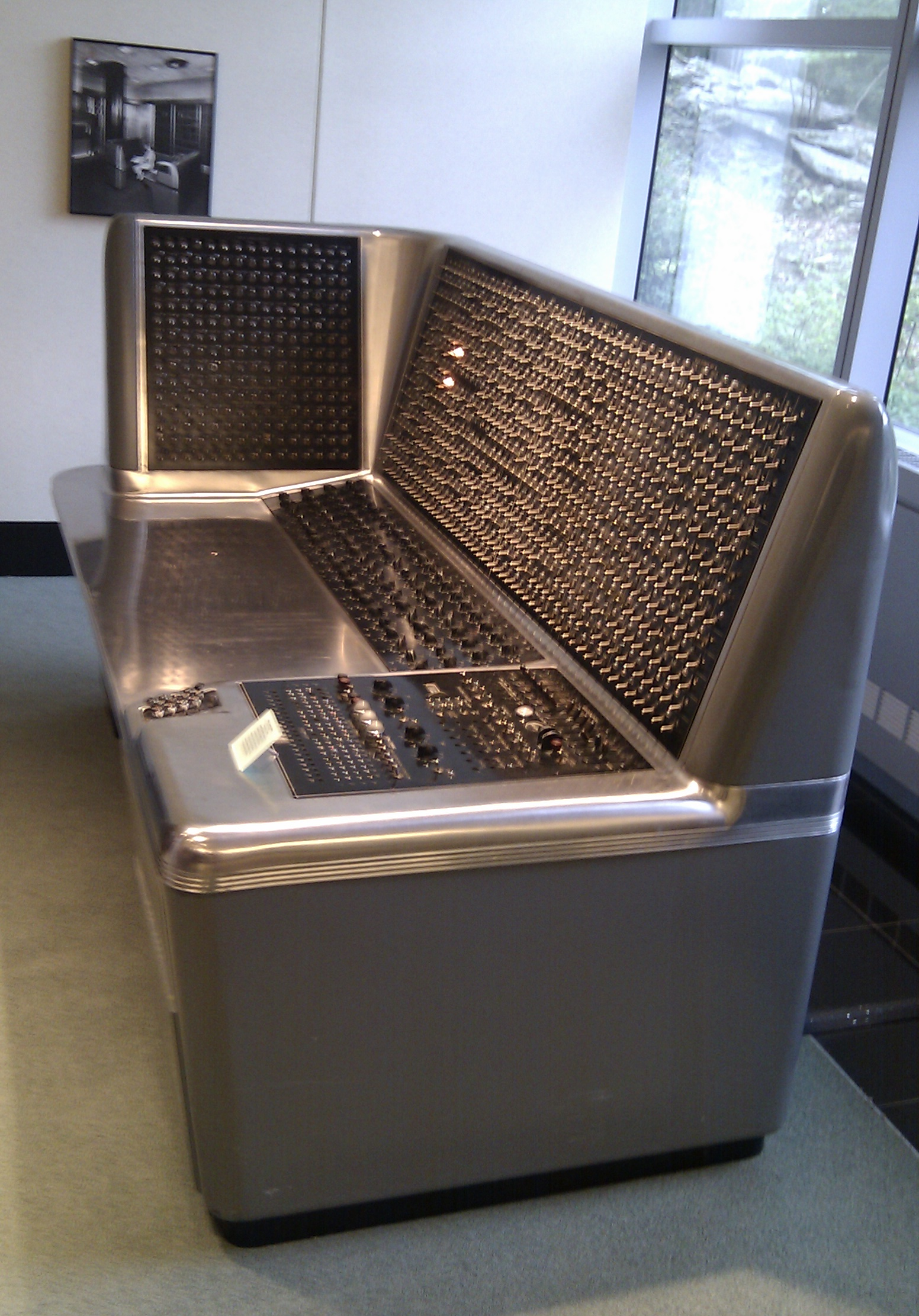
An IBM SSEC

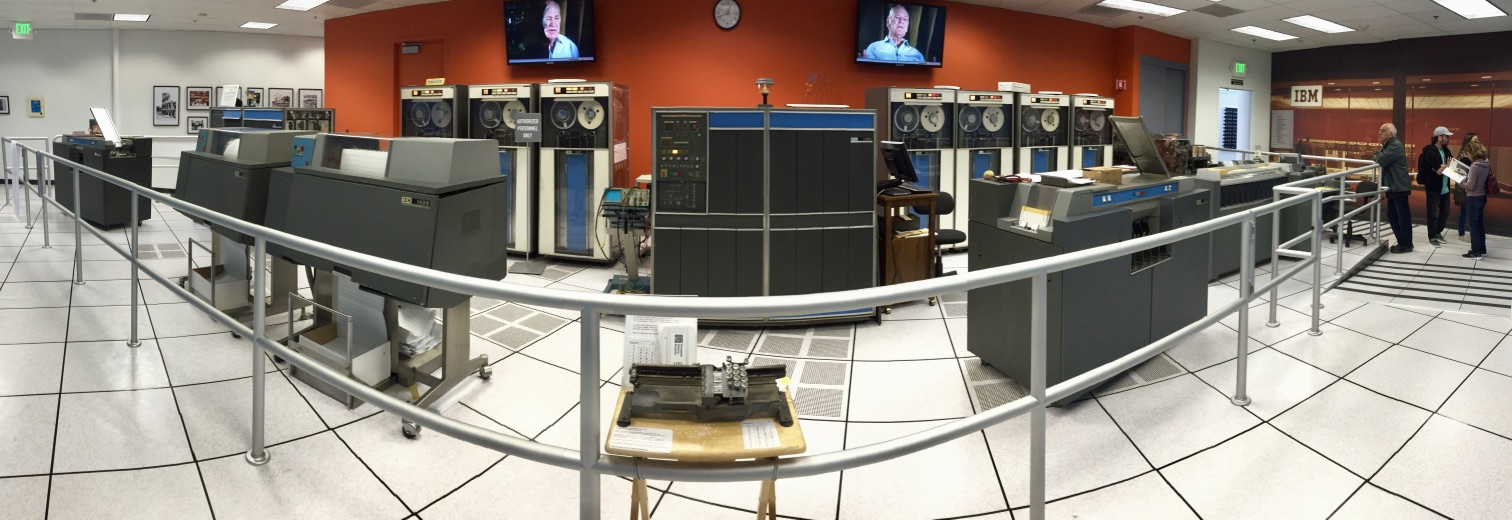
An IBM 1401

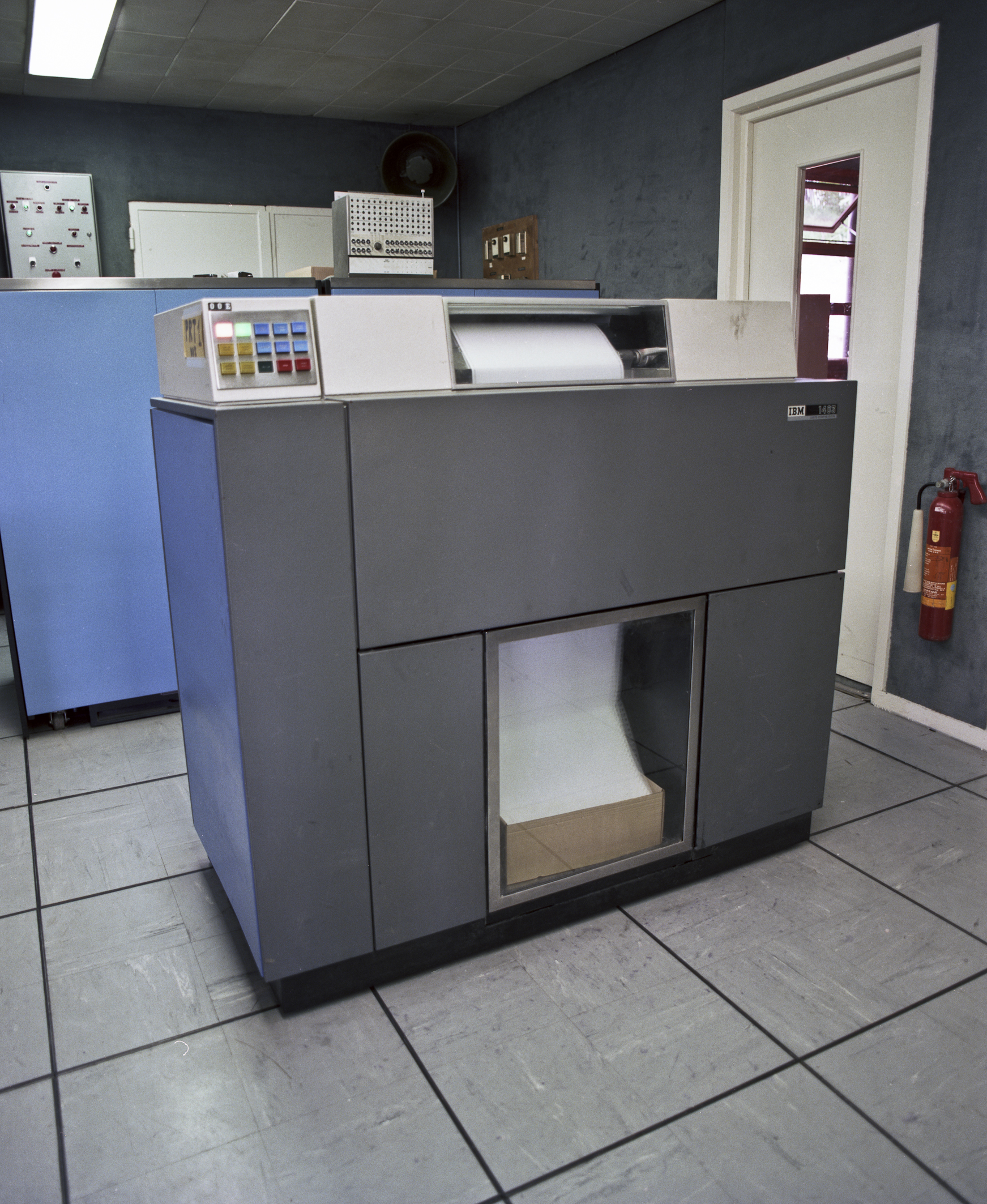
An IBM 1403

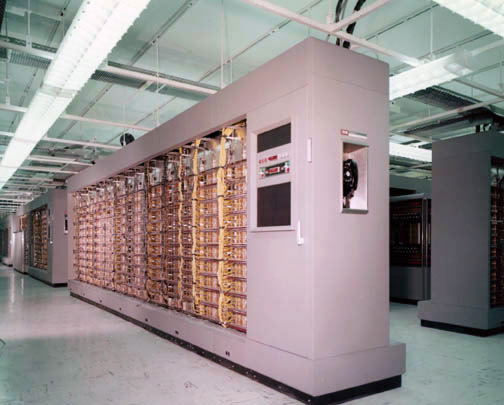
An IBM AN/FSQ-7 Combat Direction Central

IBM introduced its first computer in 1951, closely following Remington Rand's UNIVAC. Remarkably, within five years, IBM captured 85% of the computer market, prompting a UNIVAC executive to express dissatisfaction at the competitive advantage IBM had garnered through effective sales strategies. Tragically, the passing of Thomas J. Watson., the company's founding father, on June 19, 1956, marked a significant shift in IBM's leadership. His eldest son, Thomas J. Watson, Jr., took over as the chief executive, after being president since 1952.

The new CEO faced formidable challenges, navigating a rapidly evolving technological landscape with emerging computer technologies like electronic computers, magnetic tape storage, disk drives, and programming, creating both competitors and market uncertainties. Internally, the company experienced substantial growth, leading to organizational and management complexities. The absence of Watson Sr.'s charismatic leadership raised concerns among senior executives about managing IBM effectively during this transformative period. In response, Watson Jr. undertook a radical restructuring of the organization, implementing a modern management structure to enhance oversight and efficiency.

Watson Jr. institutionalized IBM's well-known but unwritten practices and philosophies into formal corporate policies and programs, such as the Three Basic Beliefs, Open Door, and Speak Up! He notably introduced the company's first equal opportunity policy letter in 1953, preceding the U.S. Supreme Court decision in Brown v. Board of Education by a year and anticipating the Civil Rights Act of 1964. by 11 years.

Furthermore, Watson Jr. expanded the company's physical capabilities, establishing key research and development laboratories in various locations. Acknowledging the need to embrace transistor technology, he mandated a corporate policy in 1957, advocating the use of solid-state circuitry in all machine developments and discouraging the use of tube circuitry in new commercial machines or devices.

IBM continued its collaboration with the U.S. government, driving computational innovation, particularly during the Cold War. This collaboration was instrumental in projects like the SAGE interceptor early detection air defense system. Beginning in 1952, IBM collaborated with MIT's Lincoln Laboratory to design an air defense computer, and later became the primary computer hardware contractor for developing SAGE for the United States Air Force. This initiative enabled IBM to access groundbreaking research on real-time, digital computers and various technological advancements. IBM used its SAGE experience to build the Sabre airline reservation system, the first time the company wrote software for customers instead of just selling or leasing computers.

These strategic government partnerships, combined with pioneering computer technology research and successful commercial products, including the IBM 700 series of computer systems, IBM 650, IBM 305 RAMAC with disk drive memory, and IBM 1401, positioned IBM as the world's leading technology firm by the end of the 1950s. In the five years following Watson Sr.'s passing, IBM's size had more than doubled, its stock had quintupled, and a significant majority of computers in operation in the United States were IBM machines.

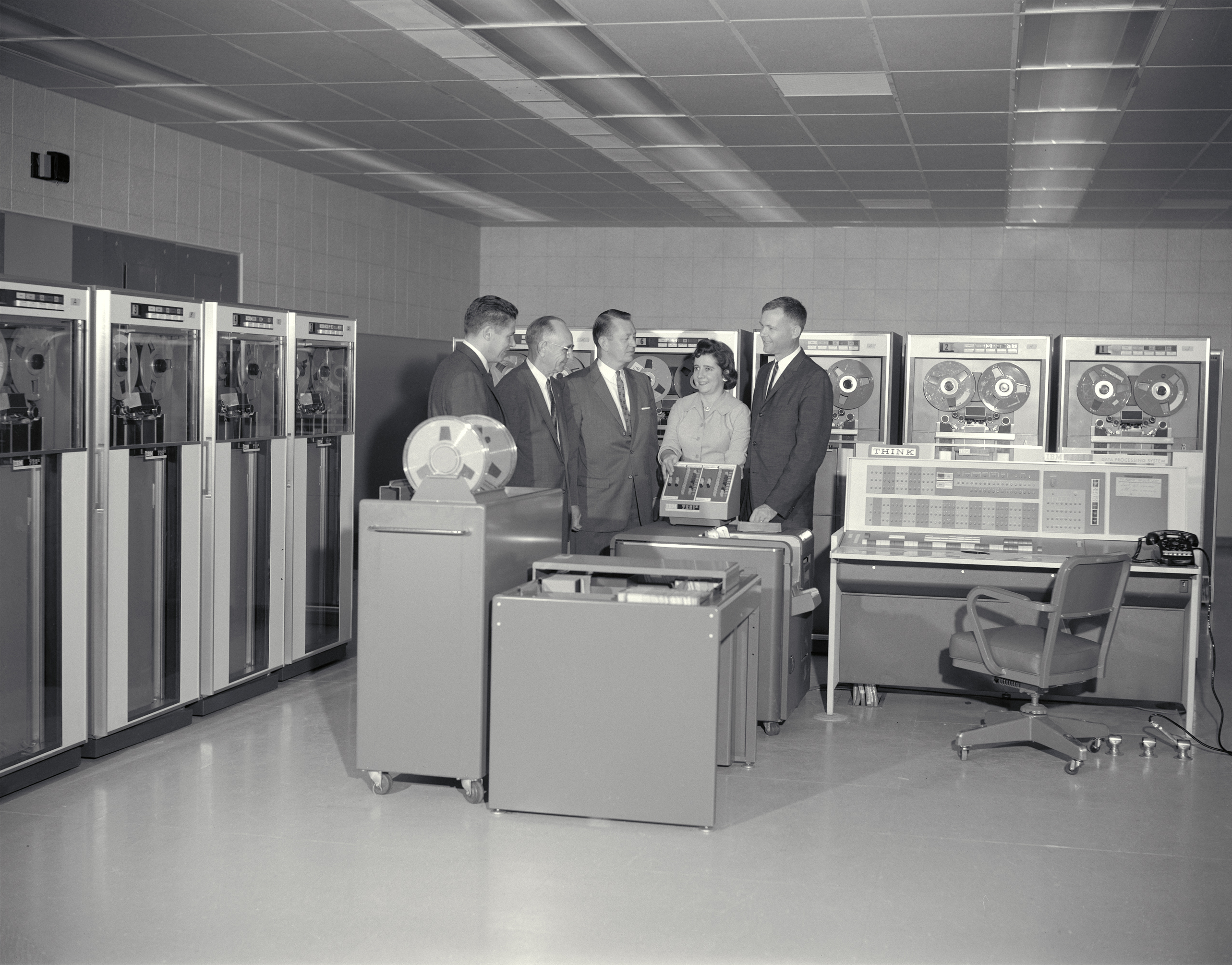
IBM 7090 installation

=== Key events ===
During the period from 1946 to 1959, IBM witnessed several significant events and developments that played a crucial role in shaping the company's trajectory and influence in the emerging computer and technology industry. These events are outlined below:

==== 1946 ====
- IBM 603: IBM announces the IBM 603 Electronic Multiplier, marking the company's first commercial product to incorporate electronic arithmetic circuits.
- Chinese character typewriter: IBM introduces an electric Chinese ideographic character typewriter, enabling users to type at a rate of 40 to 45 Chinese words per minute. The machine utilized a cylinder with engraved ideographic type faces, showcasing IBM's early forays into diverse language processing technologies.
- First black salesman: IBM hires its first black salesman, demonstrating an early commitment to diversity and inclusion, occurring well before the enactment of the Civil Rights Act of 1964.

==== 1948 ====
- IBM SSEC: IBM announced the Selective Sequence Electronic Calculator (SSEC), its initial large-scale digital calculating machine. The SSEC, employing vacuum tubes and electromechanical relays, was the first computer capable of modifying a stored program, representing a landmark in computing technology.

==== 1950s ====
- IBM's involvement in space exploration: IBM played a crucial role in space exploration endeavors, ranging from developing ballistics tables during World War II to designing intercontinental missiles and supporting satellite launching and tracking, marking a significant contribution to the aerospace industry.

==== 1952 ====
- IBM 701: IBM enters the commercial computer market with the introduction of the IBM 701, its first large-scale electronic computer manufactured in quantity. The IBM 701 played a pivotal role in establishing IBM's presence in the electronics industry.
- Magnetic tape vacuum column: IBM introduces the magnetic tape drive vacuum column, revolutionizing data storage by enabling fragile magnetic tape to become a viable medium. This innovation set the stage for the widespread adoption of magnetic storage technology.
- First California research lab: IBM opens its first West Coast laboratory in San Jose, California, a significant step that eventually contributed to the development of Silicon Valley. Within a few years, this lab played a pivotal role in inventing the hard disk drive.

==== 1953 ====
- Equal opportunity policy letter: IBM's president, Thomas J. Watson Jr., publishes the company's first written equal opportunity policy letter, showcasing an early commitment to promoting equality within the workplace.
- IBM 650: IBM announces the IBM 650 Magnetic Drum Data-Processing Machine, an intermediate-sized electronic computer designed to handle both business and scientific computations. It became highly popular during the 1950s.

==== 1954 ====
- Development of NORC: IBM develops and builds the Naval Ordnance Research Computer (NORC), the fastest and most powerful electronic computer of its time, for the U.S. Bureau of Ordnance.

==== 1956 ====
- First magnetic hard disk drive: IBM introduces the world's first magnetic hard disk for data storage, the IBM 350 disk storage unit, which stored 5 million 6-bit characters (3.75 MB) on fifty-two 24-inch diameter disks. This innovation marked the beginning of an era of efficient data storage.
- Consent decree: The United States Justice Department enters a consent decree against IBM, preventing the company from monopolizing the market for punched-card tabulating and electronic data-processing machines. The decree established regulations for IBM's operations in this domain.
- Corporate Design Initiative: IBM initiates a formal Corporate Design Program under the guidance of design consultant Eliot Noyes, seeking to create a consistent, world-class look and feel for IBM products and structures. This marked a significant step towards branding and design standardization.
- First European research lab: IBM expands its research capabilities by opening its first research lab outside the United States, in Zurich, Switzerland, further enhancing its global research and development footprint.
- Leadership transition and Williamsburg conference: Thomas J. Watson Sr. retired, passing the leadership of IBM to his son, Watson Jr. This transition was marked by a significant organizational restructuring during the Williamsburg conference, paving the way for the second generation of IBM leadership.
- Artificial intelligence: Arthur L. Samuel of IBM's Poughkeepsie laboratory demonstrates an early form of artificial intelligence by programming an IBM 704 to play checkers, showcasing the potential for machines to "learn" from their experiences.

==== 1957 ====
- IBM introduces the FORTRAN programming language, contributing to numerical analysis and scientific computing.

==== 1958 ====
- SAGE AN/FSQ-7 computer: IBM is contracted to build the SAGE (Semi-Automatic Ground Environment) AN/FSQ-7 computer for MIT's Lincoln Laboratory, a critical component of the North American Air Defense System.

==== 1959 ====
- IBM 1401: IBM introduces the IBM 1401, the first high-volume, stored-program, core-memory, transistorized computer. Its versatility in running enterprise applications made it highly popular in the early 1960s.
- IBM 1403: IBM launches the 1403 chain printer, marking the advent of high-speed, high-volume impact printing, a significant advancement in the field of data output and document processing.

These events collectively reflect IBM's prominent role in the evolution of computing technology, its commitment to innovation, and its pioneering contributions to various aspects of the emerging computer industry during the late 1940s and 1950s.

== 1960–1969: The System/360 era, unbundling software and services ==
Year	Gross income (in $m)	Employees
1955	696	56,297
1960	1,810	104,241
1965	3,750	172,445
1970	7,500	269,291

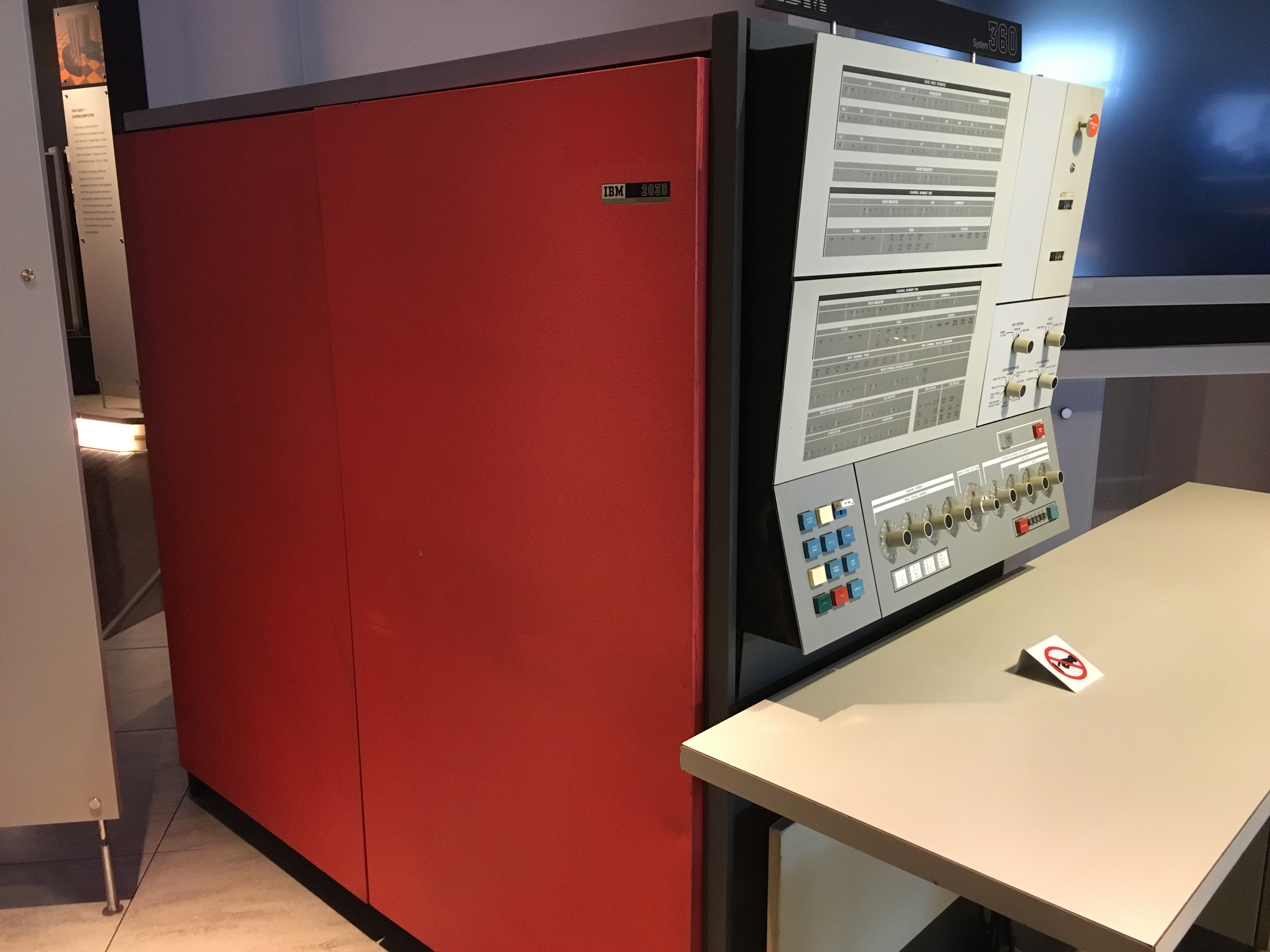
An IBM System/360

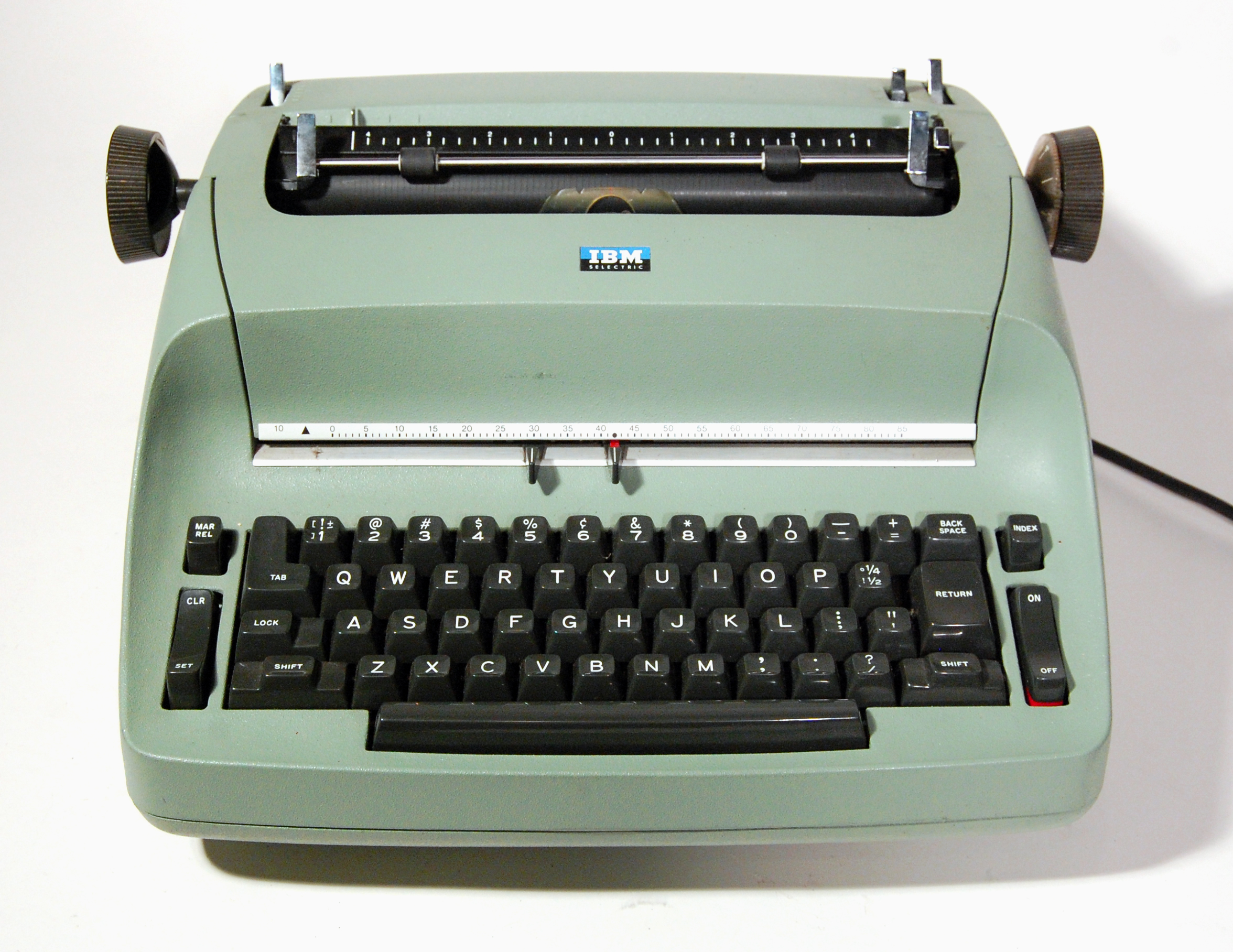
An IBM Selectric typewriter.

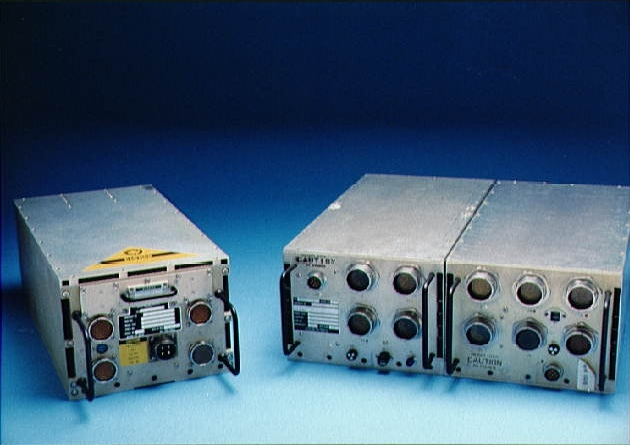
An IBM System/4 Pi

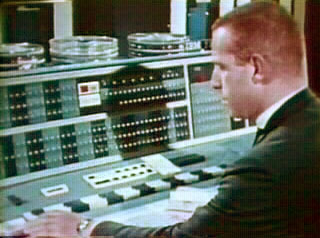
An IBM 7090

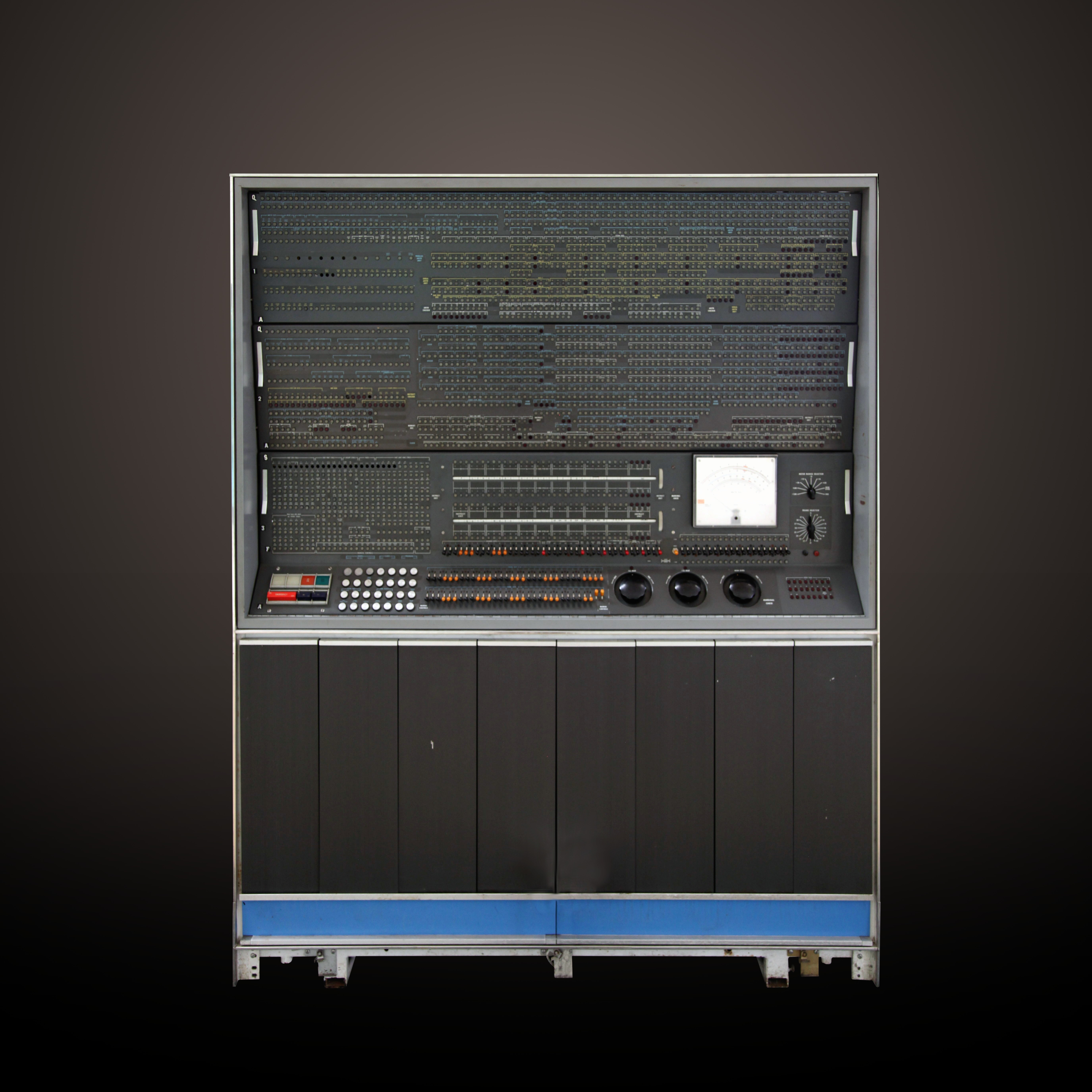
An IBM 7030 Stretch

On April 7, 1964, IBM introduced the revolutionary System/360, the first large "family" of computers to use interchangeable software and peripheral equipment, a departure from IBM's existing product line of incompatible machines, each of which was designed to solve specific customer requirements. The idea of a general-purpose machine was considered a gamble at the time.

Within two years, the System/360 became the dominant mainframe computer in the marketplace and its architecture became a de facto industry standard. During this time, IBM transformed from a medium-sized maker of tabulating equipment and typewriters into the world's largest computer company.

In 1969, IBM "unbundled" software and services from hardware sales. Until this time customers did not pay for software or services separately from the high price for the hardware. Software was provided at no additional charge, generally in source code form. Services (systems engineering, education and training, system installation) were provided free of charge at the discretion of the IBM Branch office. This practice existed throughout the industry.

IBM's unbundling is widely credited with leading to the growth of the software industry. After the unbundling, IBM software was divided into two main categories: System Control Programming (SCP), which remained free to customers, and Program Products (PP), which were charged for. This transformed the customer's value proposition for computer solutions, giving a significant monetary value to something that had essentially been free. This helped enable the creation of the software industry. Similarly, IBM services were divided into two categories: general information, which remained free and provided at the discretion of IBM, and on-the-job assistance and training of customer personnel, which were subject to a separate charge and were open to non-IBM customers. This decision vastly expanded the market for independent computing services companies.

The company began four decades of Olympic sponsorship with the 1960 Winter Games in Squaw Valley, California. It became a recognized leader in corporate social responsibility, joining federal equal opportunity programs in 1962, opening an inner-city manufacturing plant in 1968, and creating a minority supplier program. It led efforts to improve data security and protect privacy. It set environmental air/water emissions standards that exceeded those dictated by law and brought all its facilities into compliance with those standards. It opened one of the world's most advanced research centers in Yorktown, New York. Its international operations produced more than half of IBM's revenues by the early 1970s. The resulting technology transfer shaped the way governments and businesses operated around the world. IBM personnel and technology played an integral role in the space program and landing the first humans on the Moon in 1969. In that same year, it changed the way it marketed its technology to customers, unbundling hardware from software and services, effectively starting today's software and services industry. See unbundling of software and services, below. IBM was massively profitable, with a nearly fivefold increase in revenues and earnings during the 1960s.

In 1967, Thomas John Watson Jr. announced that IBM would open a large-scale manufacturing plant at Boca Raton, Florida, to produce its System/360 Model 20 midsized computer. On March 16, 1967, a headline in the Boca Raton News announced "IBM to hire 400 by year's end." The plan was for IBM to lease facilities to start making computers until the new site could be developed. A few months later, hiring began for assembly and production control trainees. IBM's Juan Rianda moved from Poughkeepsie, New York, to become the first plant manager at IBM's new Boca operations. To design its new campus, IBM commissioned architect Marcel Breuer, who worked closely with American architect Robert Gatje. In September 1967, the Boca team shipped the first IBM System/360 Model 20 to the City of Clearwater – the first computer in its production run. A year later, IBM 1130 Computing Systems were being produced and shipped. By 1970, IBM's Boca workforce grew to around 1,300 in part due to a Systems Development Engineering Laboratory being added to the division's operations.

=== Key events ===
==== 1961 ====
- IBM delivers its first 7030 Stretch supercomputer. Stretch falls short of its original design objectives, and is not a commercial success. But it is a product that pioneers numerous revolutionary computing technologies which are soon widely adopted by the computer industry.
- IBM moves its research headquarters from Poughkeepsie, NY to Westchester County, NY, opening the Thomas J. Watson Research Center which remains IBM's largest research facility, centering on semiconductors, computer science, physical science, and mathematics. The lab which IBM established at Columbia University in 1945 was closed and moved to the Yorktown Heights laboratory in 1970.
- IBM introduces the Selectric typewriter product line. Later Selectric models feature memory, giving rise to the concepts of word processing and desktop publishing. The machine won numerous awards for its design and functionality. Selectrics and their descendants eventually captured 75 percent of the United States market for electric typewriters used in business. IBM replaced the Selectric line with the IBM Wheelwriter in 1984 and transferred its typewriter business to the newly formed Lexmark in 1991.
- IBM offers its Report Program Generator, an application that allows IBM 1401 users to produce reports. This capability was adopted throughout the industry, becoming a feature offered in subsequent generations of computers. It played a role in the introduction of computers into small businesses.

==== 1962 ====
- Basic beliefs: Drawing on established IBM policies, Thomas J. Watson Jr., codifies three IBM basic beliefs: respect for the individual, customer service, and excellence.
- SABRE: Two IBM 7090 mainframes form the backbone of the SABRE reservation system for American Airlines. As the first airline reservation system to work live over phone lines, SABRE linked high-speed computers and data communications to handle seat inventory and passenger records.

==== 1964 ====
- IBM System/360: IBM introduces the IBM System/360 which creates a "family" of small to large computers, incorporating IBM Solid Logic Technology (SLT) microelectronics and using the same programming instructions. The concept of a compatible "family" of computers transforms the industry.
- Word processing: IBM introduces the Selectric Typewriter, a product that pioneered the application of magnetic recording devices to typewriting, and gave rise to desktop word processing. Referred to then as "power typing", the feature of revising stored text improved office efficiency by allowing typists to type at "rough draft" speed without the pressure of worrying about mistakes.
- New corporate headquarters. IBM moves its corporate headquarters from New York City to Armonk, New York.

==== 1965 ====
- Gemini space flights: A 59-pound onboard IBM guidance computer is used on all Gemini space flights, including the first spaceship rendezvous. IBM scientists complete the most precise computation of the Moon's orbit and develop a fabrication technique to connect hundreds of circuits on a silicon wafer.
- New York World's Fair: The IBM Pavilion at the New York World's Fair closes, having hosted more than 10 million visitors during its two-year existence.

==== 1966 ====
- Dynamic random-access memory (DRAM): IBM invents one-transistor DRAM cells which permit major increases in memory capacity. DRAM chips become the mainstay of modern computer memory systems.
- IBM System/4 Pi: IBM ships its first System/4Pi computer, designed to meet U.S. Department of Defense and NASA requirements. More than 9000 units of the 4Pi systems are delivered by the 1980s for use in the air, sea, and in space.
- IBM Information Management System (IMS): IBM designed the Information Management System (IMS) with Rockwell and Caterpillar starting in 1966 for the Apollo program, where it was used to inventory the very large bill of materials (BOM) for the Saturn V Moon rocket and Apollo space vehicle.

==== 1967 ====
- Fractal geometry: IBM researcher Benoit Mandelbrot conceives fractal geometry – the concept that seemingly irregular shapes can have identical structure at all scales. This new geometry makes it possible to mathematically describe the kinds of irregularities existing in nature. The concept greatly impacts the fields of engineering, economics, metallurgy, art, health sciences, and computer graphics and animation.

==== 1968 ====
- IBM Customer Information Control System (CICS): IBM introduces the CICS transaction monitor. CICS remains to this day the industry's most popular transaction monitor.

==== 1969 ====
- Antitrust: The United States government launches what would become a 13-year-long antitrust suit against IBM. The suit is controversially dropped by the U.S. government in 1982.
- Unbundling: IBM adopts a new marketing policy that charges separately for most systems engineering activities, future computer programs, and customer education courses. This "unbundling" gives rise to the software and services industry.
- Magnetic stripe cards: The American National Standards Institute makes the IBM-developed magnetic stripe technology a national standard, making possible new business models such as the credit card industry. Two years later, the International Organization for Standardization adopts the IBM design, making it a world standard.
- First Moon landing: IBM personnel and computers help NASA land the first men on the Moon.

== 1970–1974: The challenges of success ==
Year	Gross income (in $m)	Employees
1965	3,750	172,445
1970	7,500	269,291
1975	14,430	288,647

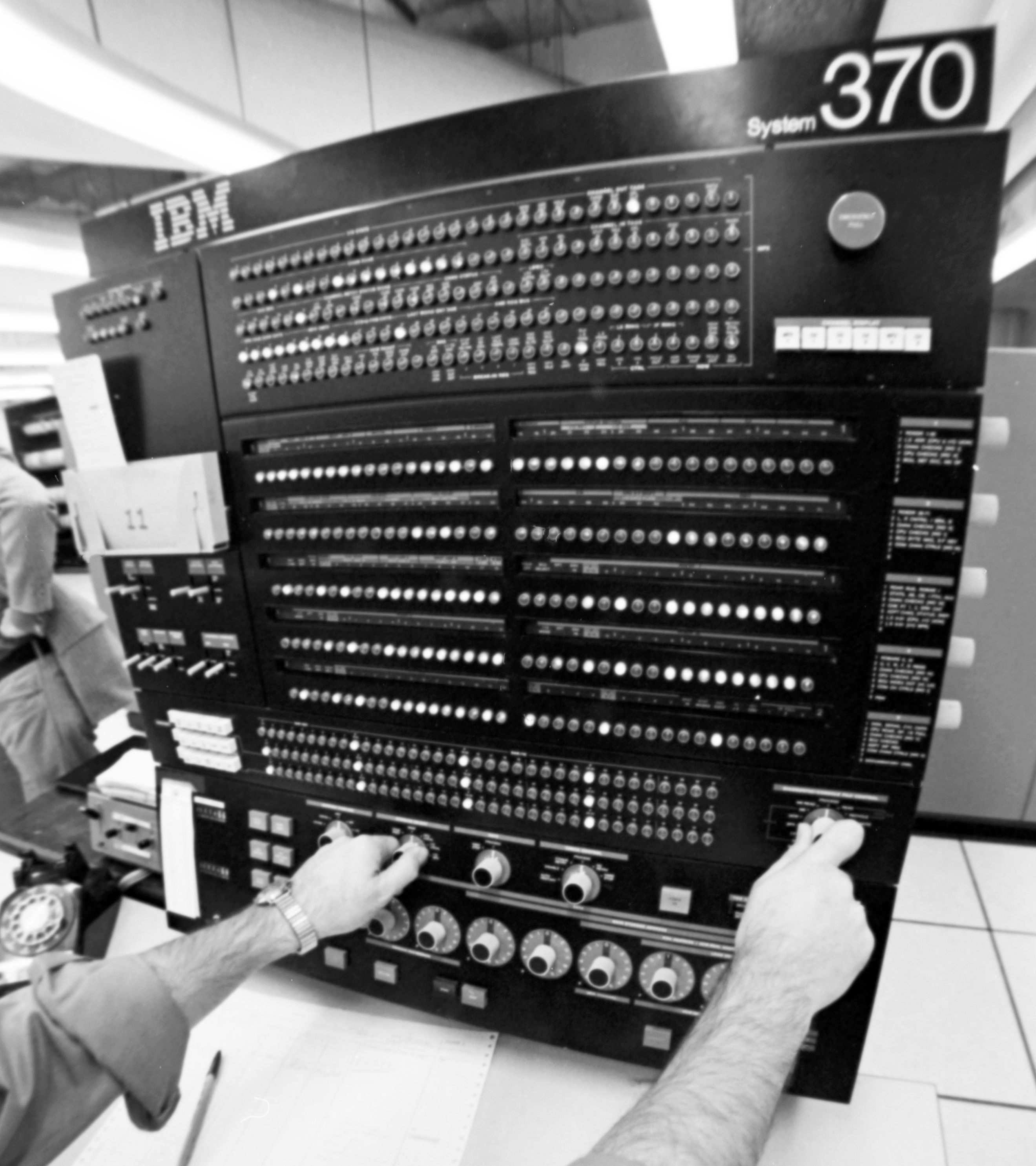
An IBM System/370.

The Golden Decade of the 1960s was a hard act to follow, and the 1970s got off to a troubling start when CEO Thomas J. Watson Jr. suffered a heart attack and retired in 1971. For the first time since 1914 – nearly six decades – IBM would not have a Watson at the helm. Moreover, after just one leadership change over those nearly 60 years, IBM would endure two in two years. T. Vincent Learson succeeded Watson as CEO, then quickly retired upon reaching the mandatory retirement age of 60 in 1973. Following Learson in the CEO office was Frank T. Cary, a 25-year IBMer who had run the data processing division in the 1960s.

Datamation in 1971 stated that "the perpetual, ominous force called IBM rolls on". The company's dominance let it keep prices high and rarely update products, all built with only IBM components. During Cary's tenure as CEO, the IBM System/370 was introduced in 1970 as IBM's new mainframe. The S/370 did not prove as technologically revolutionary as its predecessor, the System/360. From a revenue perspective, it more than sustained the cash cow status of the 360.

A less successful effort to replicate the 360 mainframe revolution was the Future Systems project. Between 1971 and 1975, IBM investigated the feasibility of a new revolutionary line of products designed to make obsolete all existing products in order to re-establish its technical supremacy. This effort was terminated by IBM's top management in 1975. By then it had consumed most of the high-level technical planning and design resources, thus jeopardizing progress of the existing product lines (although some elements of FS were later incorporated into actual products).

Other IBM innovations during the early 1970s included the IBM 3340 disk unit – introduced in 1973 and known as "Winchester" after IBM's internal project name – which was a storage technology which more than doubled the information density on disk surfaces. Winchester technology was adopted by the industry and used for the next two decades.

Some 1970s-era IBM technologies emerged to become facets of everyday life. IBM developed magnetic stripe technology in the 1960s, and it became a credit card industry standard in 1971. The IBM-invented floppy disk, also introduced in 1971, became the standard for storing personal computer data during the first decades of the PC era. IBM Research scientist Edgar 'Ted' Codd wrote a seminal paper describing the relational database, an invention that Forbes magazine described as one of the most important innovations of the 20th century. The IBM 5100, 50 lbs. and $9000 of personal mobility, was introduced in 1975 and presaged – at least in function if not size or price or units sold – the Personal Computer of the 1980s. IBM's 3660 supermarket checkout station, introduced in 1973, used holographic technology to scan product prices from UPC bar codes, which itself was based a 1952 IBM patent that became a grocery industry standard. Also in 1973, bank customers began making withdrawals, transfers and other account inquiries via the IBM 3614 Consumer Transaction Facility, an early form of today's Automatic Teller Machines.

IBM had an innovator's role in pervasive technologies that were less visible as well. In 1974, IBM announced Systems Network Architecture (SNA), a networking protocol for computing systems. SNA is a uniform set of rules and procedures for computer communications to free computer users from the technical complexities of communicating through local, national, and international computer networks. SNA became the most widely used system for data processing until more open architecture standards were approved in the 1990s. In 1975, IBM researcher Benoit Mandelbrot conceived fractal geometry – a new geometrical concept that made it possible to describe mathematically the kinds of irregularities existing in nature. Fractals had a great impact on engineering, economics, metallurgy, art and health sciences, and are integral to the field of computer graphics and animation.

A less successful business endeavor for IBM was its entry into the office copier market in the 1970s, after turning down the opportunity to purchase the xerography technology. The company was immediately sued by Xerox Corporation for patent infringement. Although Xerox held the patents for the use of selenium as a photoconductor, IBM researchers perfected the use of organic photoconductors which avoided the Xerox patents. The litigation lasted until the late 1970s and was ultimately settled. Despite this victory, IBM never gained traction in the copier market and withdrew from the marketplace in the 1980s. Organic photoconductors are now widely used in copiers.

Throughout this period, IBM was litigating the antitrust suit filed by the Justice Department in 1969. But in a related bit of case law, the landmark Honeywell v. Sperry Rand U.S. federal court case was concluded in April 1973. The 1964 patent for the ENIAC, the world's first general-purpose electronic digital computer, was found both invalid and unenforceable for a variety of reasons thus putting the invention of the electronic digital computer into the public domain. However, IBM was ruled to have created a monopoly via its 1956 patent-sharing agreement with Sperry-Rand.

American antitrust laws did not directly affect IBM in Europe, where as of 1971 it had fewer competitors and more than 50% market share in almost every country. Customers preferred IBM because it was, as Datamation said, "the only truly international computer company", able to serve clients almost anywhere. Rivals such as ICL, CII, and Siemens began to cooperate to preserve a European computer industry.

In the early 1970s, the Examination Department of the South Vietnamese Ministry of Education contracted with IBM to computerize all examination records, from registration and application forms to certificates of admission and necessary statistical data. By 1974, all subjects in the South Vietnamese high school graduation exam were converted to multiple-choice questions. Answer sheets for the multiple-choice exams were ordered from the United States, and candidates' papers were graded using an IBM 1230 machine. The graded papers were then transferred to an IBM 534 machine for punching. These punched sheets were then fed into an IBM 360 machine to read the scores, multiply by coefficients, add up the scores, calculate the average score, standard deviation, convert raw scores to standardized scores, and calculate the admission ranking. The sample group and norm group were carefully selected according to statistical methods to calculate the average score and standard deviation. (Note: In July 1973, the South Vietnamese General Staff also established a Computer Center at 63 Gia Long Street (Saigon) to computerize the management of the military forces using the IBM System/360.)

=== Key events ===
==== 1970 ====
- System/370: IBM announces System/370 as successor to System/360.
- Relational databases: IBM introduces relational databases which call for information stored within a computer to be arranged in easy-to-interpret tables to access and manage large amounts of data. Today, most database structures are based on the IBM concept of relational databases.
- Office copiers: IBM introduces its first of three models of xerographic copiers. These machines mark the first commercial use of organic photoconductors which since became the dominant technology.

==== 1971 ====
- Speech recognition: IBM achieves its first operational application of speech recognition, which enables engineers servicing equipment to talk to and receive spoken answers from a computer that can recognize about 5,000 words. Today, IBM's ViaVoice recognition technology has a vocabulary of 64,000 words and a 260,000-word back-up dictionary.
- Floppy disk. IBM introduces the floppy disk. Convenient and portable, the floppy becomes a personal computer industry standard for storing data.

==== 1973 ====
- Winchester storage technology: The IBM 3340 disk unit – known as "Winchester" after IBM's internal project name – is introduced, more than doubling the information density on disk surfaces. It featured a smaller, lighter read/write head that rode on an air film only 18 millionths of an inch thick. Winchester technology was adopted by the industry and used for the next two decades.
- Nobel Prize: Dr. Leo Esaki, an IBM Fellow who joined the company in 1960, shares the 1973 Nobel Prize in physics for his 1958 discovery of the phenomenon of electron tunneling. His discovery of the semiconductor junction called the Esaki diode finds wide use in electronics applications. More importantly, his work in the field of semiconductors lays a foundation for further exploration in the electronic transport of solids.

==== 1974 ====
- SNA: IBM announces Systems Network Architecture (SNA), a networking protocol for computing systems. SNA is a uniform set of rules and procedures for computer communications to free computer users from the technical complexities of communicating through local, national, and international computer networks. SNA becomes the most widely used system for data processing until more open architecture standards were approved in the 1990s.

== 1975–1992: Information revolution, rise of software and PC industries ==
Year	Gross income (in $m)	Employees
1975	14,430	288,647
1980	26,210	341,279
1985	50,050	405,535
1990	69,010	373,816
1995	71,940	225,347

President of IBM John R. Opel became CEO in 1981. IBM was one of the world's largest companies and had a 62% share of the mainframe computer market that year. While frequently relocated employees and families still joked that IBM stood for "I've Been Moved", and employees of acquisitions feared that formal IBM employees would change the culture of their more casual offices, IBM no longer required white shirts for male employees, who still wore conservative suits when meeting customers. Former employees such as Gene Amdahl used their training to found and lead many competitors and suppliers.

Expecting Japanese competition, IBM in the late 1970s began investing in manufacturing to lower costs, offering volume discounts and lower prices to large customers, and introducing new products more frequently. The company also sometimes used non-IBM components in products, and sometimes resold others' products as its own. In 1980 it introduced its first computer terminal compatible with non-IBM equipment, and Displaywriter was the first new product less expensive than the competition. IBM's share of the overall computer market, however, declined from 60% in 1970 to 32% in 1980. Perhaps distracted by the long-running antitrust lawsuit, the "Colossus of Armonk" missed the fast-growing minicomputer market during the 1970s, and was behind rivals such as Wang, Hewlett-Packard (HP), and Control Data in other areas.

In 1979, BusinessWeek asked, "Is IBM just another stodgy, mature company?" By 1981 its stock price had declined by 22%; that year Financial World wondered "What Ails IBM?", and The Wall Street Journal described the company as a "dull performer". IBM's earnings for the first half of 1981 grew by 5.3% – one third of the inflation rate – while those of Digital Equipment Corporation (DEC) grew by more than 35%. Although IBM began selling minicomputers, in January 1982 the Justice Department ended the antitrust suit, after IBM unbundled services and, as The New York Times reported, experts concluded that IBM no longer dominated the computer industry.

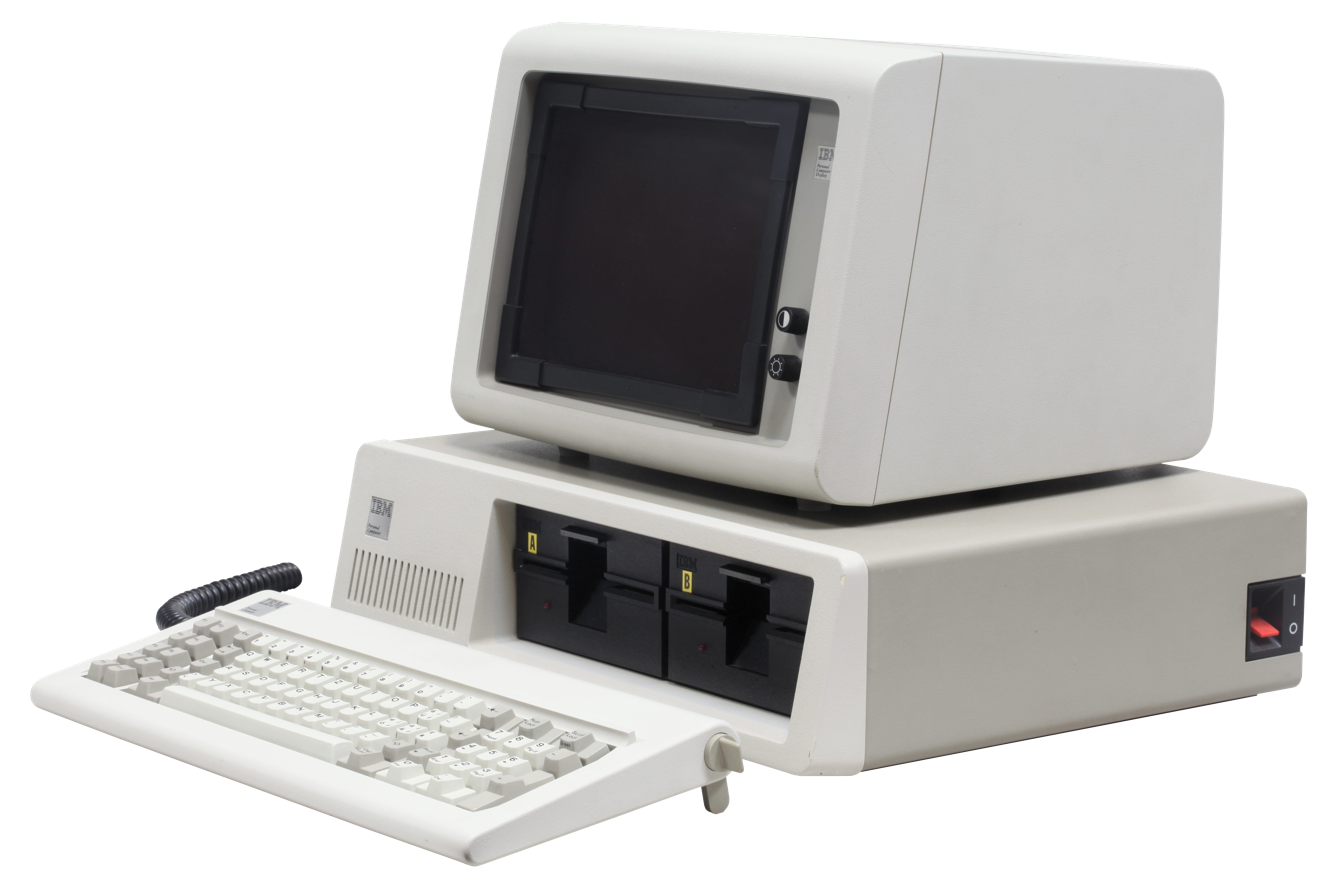
The original IBM PC (c. 1981)

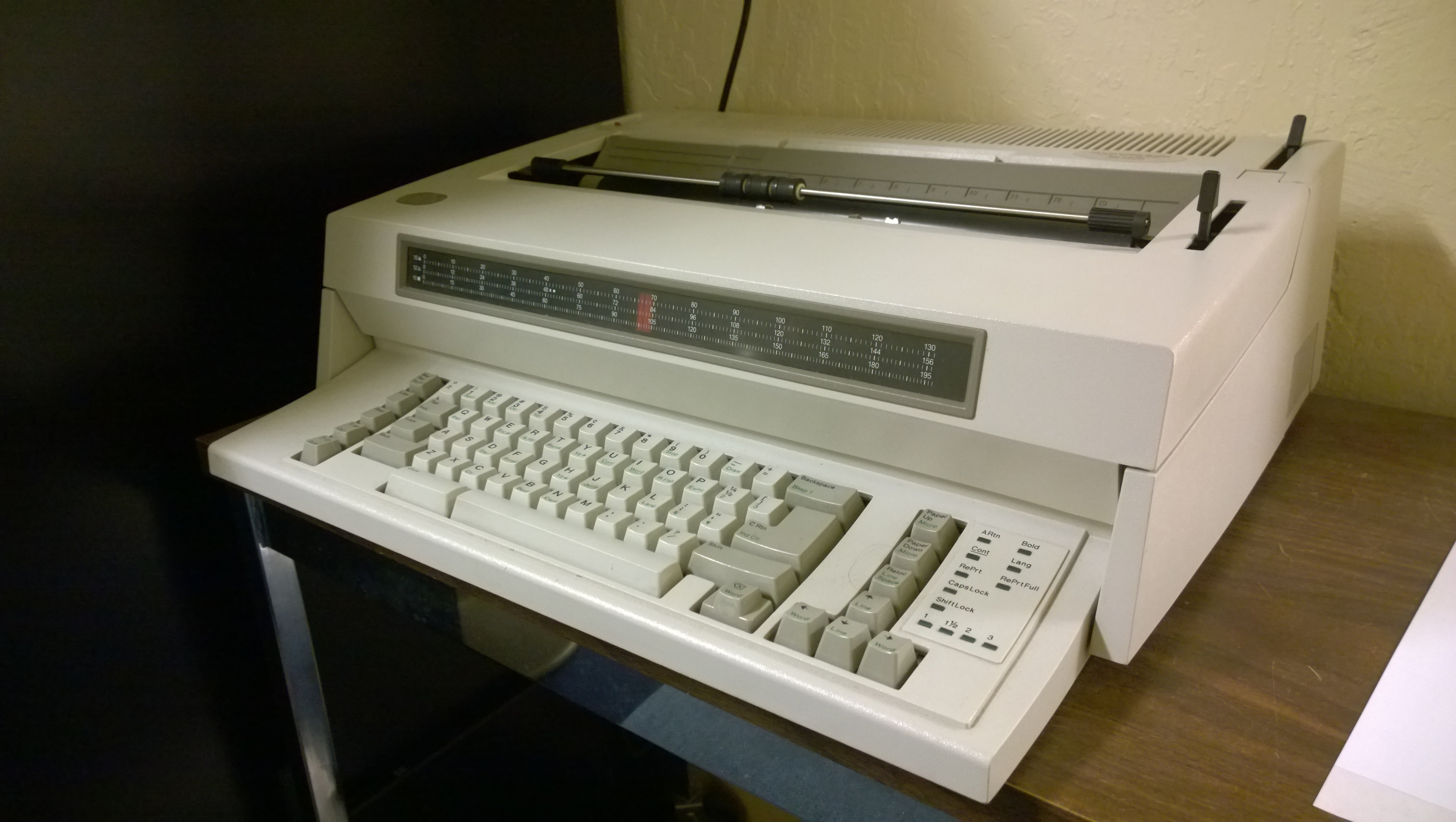
An IBM Wheelwriter

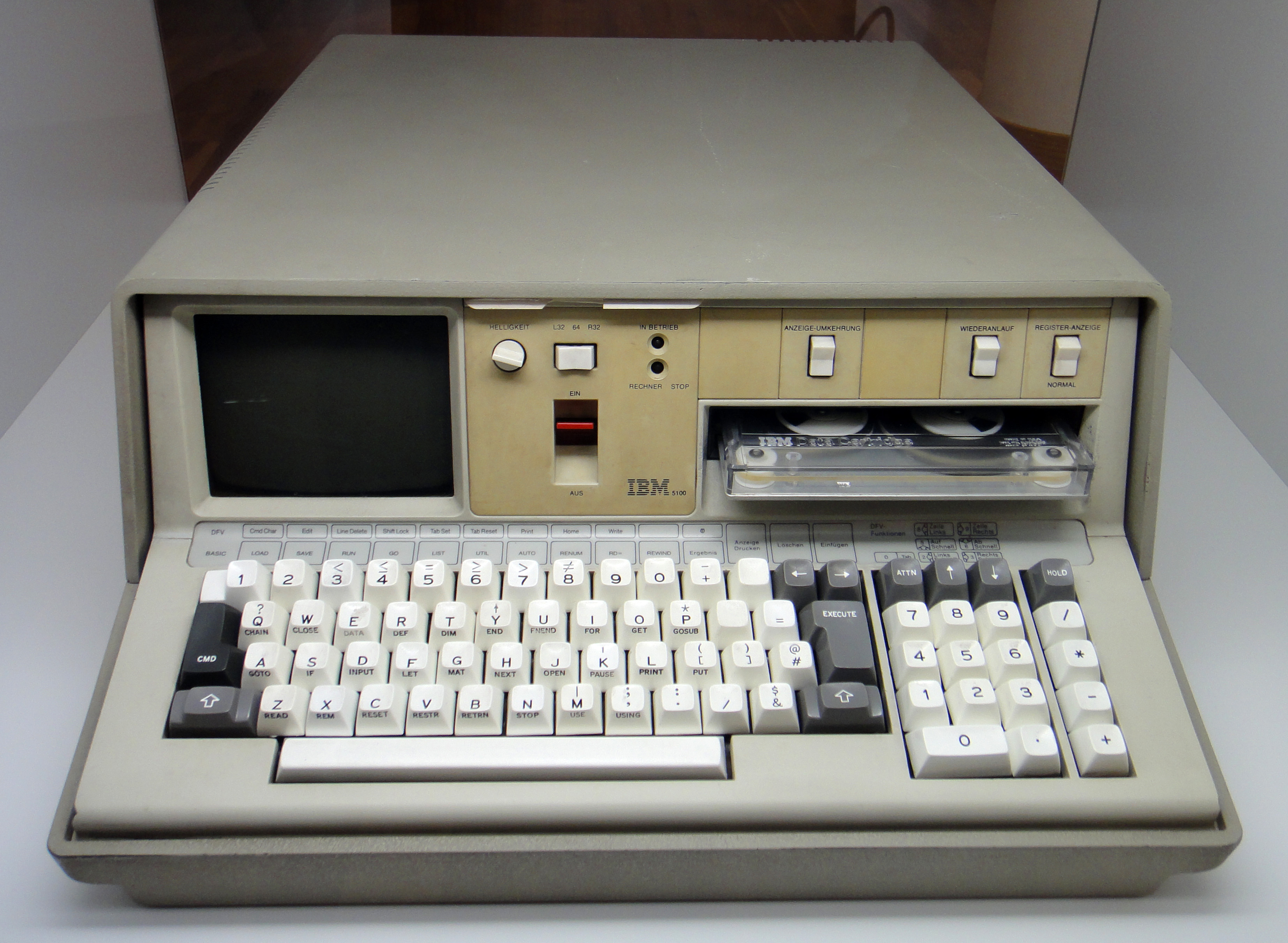
An IBM 5100

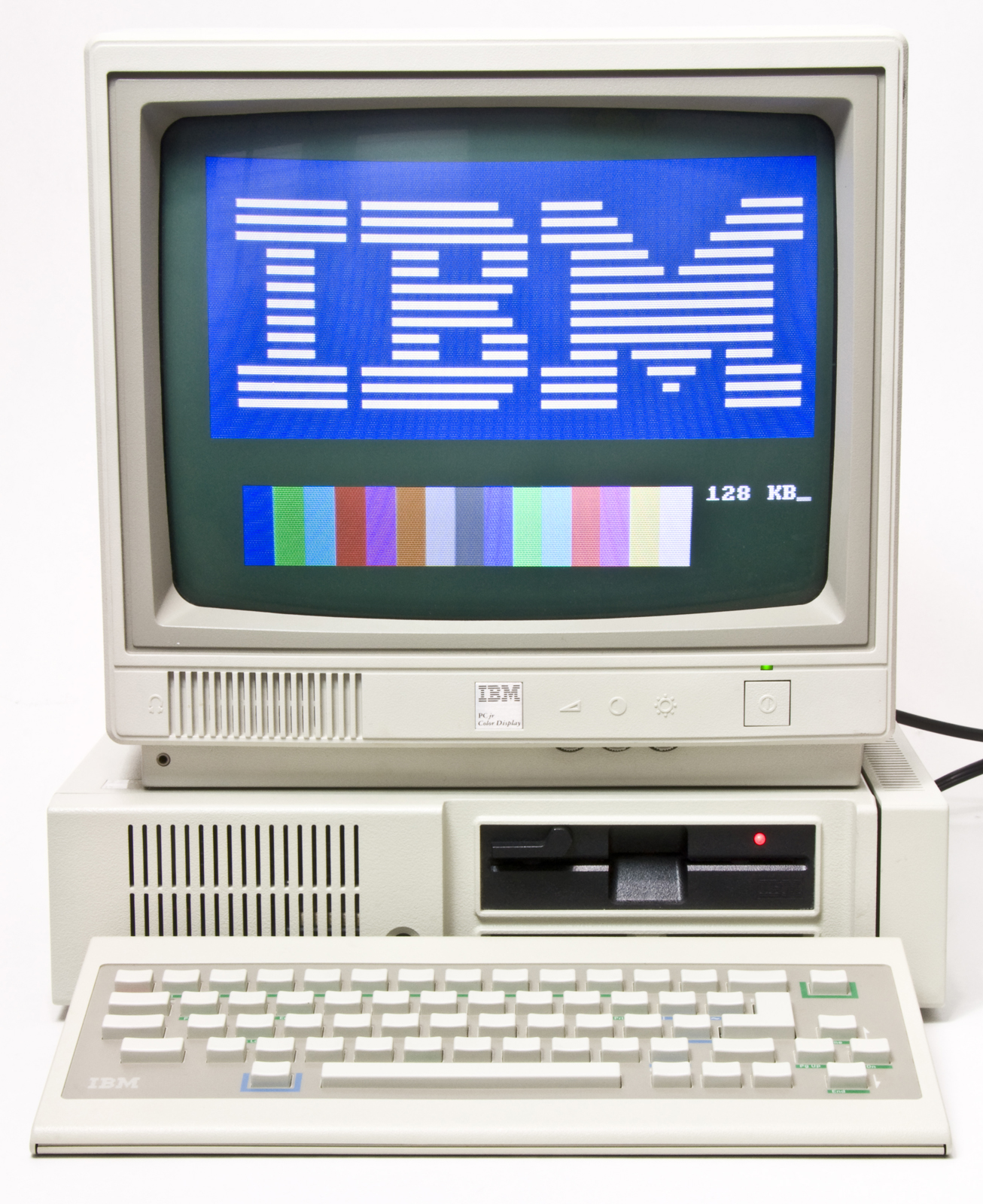
An IBM PCjr

IBM wished to avoid the same outcome with the new personal computer industry. The company studied the market for years and, as with UNIVAC, others like Apple Computer entered it first; IBM did not want a product with a rival's logo on corporate customers' desks. The company opened its first Product Center retail store in November 1980, and a team in the Boca Raton, Florida, office built the IBM PC using commercial off-the-shelf components. The new computer debuted on August 12, 1981 from the Entry Systems Division led by Don Estridge. IBM immediately became more of a presence in the consumer marketplace, thanks to the Little Tramp advertising campaign. The IBM PC brought together all of the most desirable features of a computer into one small machine. It had 128 kilobytes of memory (expandable to 256 kilobytes), one or two floppy disks and an optional color monitor. Although not inexpensive, with a base price of US$1,565, it was purchased by many businesses. Reassured by the IBM name, they began buying these microcomputers on their own budgets aimed at numerous applications that corporate computer departments did not, and in many cases could not, accommodate. Typically, these purchases were not by corporate computer departments, as the PC was not seen as a "proper" computer. Purchases were often instigated by middle managers and senior staff who saw the potential – once the revolutionary VisiCalc spreadsheet, the killer app, had been surpassed by a far more powerful and stable product, Lotus 1-2-3.

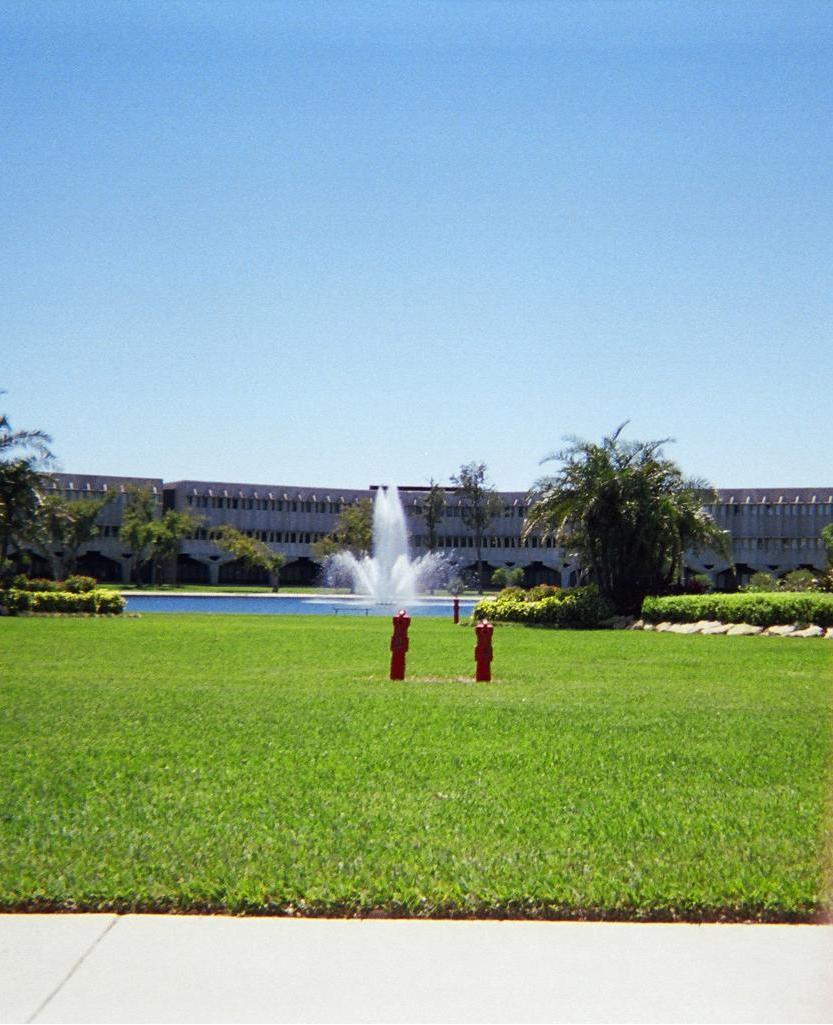
Boca Corporate Center & Campus was originally one of IBM's research labs where the IBM PC was created.

The PC improved IBM's reputation with investors, customers, and the general public. IBM's dominance of the mainframe market in Europe and the US encouraged existing customers to buy the PC, and vice versa; as sales of what had been an experiment in a new market became a substantial part of IBM's financials, the company found that customers also bought larger IBM computers. Unlike the BUNCH and other rivals IBM quickly adjusted to the retail market, with its own sales force competing with outside retailers for the first time. By 1985 IBM was the world's most profitable industrial company, and its sales of personal computers were larger than that of minicomputers despite having been in the latter market since the early 1970s.

By 1983 industry analyst Gideon Gartner warned that IBM "is creating a dangerous situation for competitors in the marketplace". The company helped others by defining technical standards and creating large new software markets, but the new aggressiveness that began in the late 1970s helped it dominate areas like computer leasing and computer-aided design. Free from the antitrust case, IBM was present in every computer market other than supercomputers, and entered communications by purchasing Rolm – the first acquisition in 18 years – and 18% of MCI. The company was so important to component suppliers that it urged them to diversify. When IBM (61% of revenue) abruptly reduced orders from Miniscribe shares of not only Miniscribe but that of uninvolved companies that sold to IBM fell, as investors feared their vulnerability. IBM was also vulnerable when suppliers could not fulfill orders, and customers and dealers also feared becoming overdependent; the PC was so popular in 1983 that dealers only received 60% or less of the inventory they wanted.

The IBM PC AT's 1984 debut startled the industry. Rivals admitted that they did not expect the low price of the sophisticated product. IBM's attack on every area of the computer industry and entry into communications caused competitors, analysts, and the press to speculate that it would again be sued for antitrust. Datamation and others said that the company's continued growth might hurt the United States, by suppressing startups with new technology. Gartner Group estimated in 1985 that of the 100 largest data-processing companies, IBM had 41% of all revenue and 69% of profit. Its computer revenue was about nine times that of second-place DEC, and larger than that of IBM's six largest Japanese competitors combined. The 22% profit margin was three times the 6.7% average for the other 99 companies. Competitors complained to Congress, ADAPSO discussed the company with the Justice Department, and European governments worried about IBM's influence but feared affecting its more than 100,000 employees there at 19 facilities.

However, the company soon lost its lead in both PC hardware and software, thanks in part to its unprecedented (for IBM) decision to contract PC components to outside companies like Microsoft and Intel. Up to this point in its history, IBM relied on a vertically integrated strategy, building most key components of its systems itself, including processors, operating systems, peripherals, databases and the like. In an attempt to accelerate the time-to-market for the PC, IBM chose not to build a proprietary operating system and microprocessor. Instead, it sourced these vital components from Microsoft and Intel respectively. Ironically, in a decade which marked the end of IBM's monopoly, it was this fateful decision by IBM that passed the sources of its monopolistic power (operating system and processor architecture) to Microsoft and Intel, paving the way for rise of PC compatibles and the creation of hundreds of billions of dollars of market value outside of IBM.

John Akers became IBM's CEO in 1985. During the 1980s, IBM's investment in building its research organization produced four Nobel Prize winners in physics, achieving breakthroughs in mathematics, memory storage and telecommunications, and expanded computing capabilities. In 1980, IBM researcher John Cocke introduced Reduced Instruction Set Computing (RISC). Cocke received both the National Medal of Technology and the National Medal of Science for his innovation, but IBM itself failed to recognize the importance of RISC, and lost the lead in RISC technology to Sun Microsystems.

In 1984 the company partnered with Sears to develop a pioneering online home banking and shopping service for home PCs that launched in 1988 as Prodigy. Despite a strong reputation and anticipating many of the features, functions, and technology that characterize the online experience of today, the venture was plagued by overly conservative management decisions, and was eventually sold in the mid-1990s.

The IBM token-ring local area network, introduced in 1985, permitted personal computer users to exchange information and share printers and files within a building or complex. In 1988, IBM partnered with the University of Michigan and MCI Communications to create the National Science Foundation Network (NSFNet), an important step in the creation of the Internet. But within five years the company backed away from this early lead in Internet protocols and router technologies in order to support its existing SNA revenue stream, thereby missing a boom market of the 1990s. Still, IBM investments and advances in microprocessors, disk drives, network technologies, software applications, and online commerce in the 1980s set the stage for the emergence of the connected world in the 1990s.

However, by the end of the decade, IBM was in trouble. It was a bloated organization of some 400,000 employees that was heavily invested in too many low margin, transactional, commodity businesses. Technologies IBM invented and or commercialized – DRAM, hard disk drives, the PC, electric typewriters – were starting to erode. The company had a massive international organization characterized by redundant processes and functions – its cost structure couldn't compete with smaller, less diversified competitors. Additionally, the back-to-back revolutions – the PC and the client-server – combined to undermine IBM's core mainframe business. The PC revolution placed computers directly in the hands of millions of people. It was followed by the client/server revolution, which sought to link PCs (the "clients") with larger computers that labored in the background (the "servers" that served data and applications to client machines). Both revolutions transformed the way customers viewed, used and bought technology. And both fundamentally rocked IBM and its mainframe competitors. Businesses' purchasing decisions were put in the hands of individuals and departments – not the places where IBM had long-standing customer relationships. Piece-part technologies took precedence over integrated solutions. The focus was on the desktop and personal productivity, not on business applications across the enterprise. As a result, earnings – which had been at or above US$5 billion since the early 1980s, dropped by more than a third to US$3 billion in 1989. A brief spike in earnings in 1990 did not last as corporate spending continued to shift from high-profit margin mainframes to lower margin microprocessor-based systems. In addition, corporate downsizing was in full swing.

Radical changes were considered and implemented. As IBM assessed the situation, it was clear that competition and innovation in the computer industry were now taking place along segmented, versus vertically integrated lines, where computer industry leaders emerged in their respective domains. Examples included Intel in microprocessors, Microsoft in desktop software, Novell in networking, HP in printers, Seagate in disk drives and Oracle Corporation in database software. IBM's dominance in personal computers was challenged by the likes of Compaq and later Dell. Recognizing this trend, management, with the support of the Board of Directors, began to implement a plan to split IBM into increasingly autonomous business units (e.g. processors, storage, software, services, printers, etc.) to compete more effectively with competitors that were more focused and nimble and had lower cost structures.

IBM also began spinning off its many divisions into autonomous subsidiaries (so-called "Baby Blues") in an attempt to make the company more manageable and to streamline IBM by having other investors finance those companies. These included AdStar, dedicated to disk drives and other data storage products (on creation the largest data storage business in the world); IBM Application Business Systems, dedicated to mid-range computers; IBM Enterprise Systems, dedicated to mainframes; Pennant Systems, dedicated to mid-range and large printers; Lexmark, dedicated to small printers, keyboards, and typewriters (such as the Selectric); and more. Lexmark was acquired by Clayton & Dubilier in a leveraged buyout shortly after its formation.

In September 1992, IBM combined and spun off their various non-mainframe and non-midrange, personal computer manufacturing divisions into an autonomous wholly owned subsidiary known as the IBM Personal Computer Company (IBM PC Co.). This corporate restructuring came after IBM reported a sharp drop in profit margins during the second quarter of fiscal year 1992; market analysts attributed the drop to a fierce price war in the personal computer market over the summer of 1992. The corporate restructuring was one of the largest and most expensive in history up to that point. By the summer of 1993, the IBM PC Co. had divided into multiple business units itself, including Ambra Computer Corporation and the IBM Power Personal Systems Group, the former an attempt to design and market "clone" computers of IBM's own architecture and the latter responsible for IBM's PowerPC-based workstations.

These efforts failed to halt the slide. A decade of steady acceptance and widening corporate growth of local area networking technology, a trend headed by Novell Inc. and other vendors, and its logical counterpart, the ensuing decline of mainframe sales, brought about a wake-up call for IBM. After two consecutive years of reporting losses in excess of $1 billion, on January 19, 1993, IBM announced a US$8.10 billion loss for the 1992 financial year, which was then the largest single-year corporate loss in U.S. history. All told, between 1991 and 1993, the company posted net losses of nearly $16 billion. IBM's three-decade-long Golden Age, triggered by Watson Jr. in the 1950s, was over. The computer industry now viewed IBM as no longer relevant, an organizational dinosaur. And hundreds of thousands of IBMers lost their jobs, including CEO John Akers.

=== Key events ===
==== Mid-1970s ====
- IBM VNET: The VNET international computer networking system is deployed in the mid-1970s, providing email and file-transfer for IBM. By September 1979, the network had grown to include 285 mainframe nodes in Europe, Asia, and North America.

==== 1975 ====
- Fractals: IBM researcher Benoit Mandelbrot conceives fractal geometry – the concept that seemingly irregular shapes can have identical structure at all scales. This new geometry makes it possible to describe mathematically the kinds of irregularities existing in nature. Fractals later make a great impact on engineering, economics, metallurgy, art, and health sciences, and are also applied in the field of computer graphics and animation.
- IBM 5100: IBM introduces the 5100 Portable Computer, a 50 lb. desktop machine that put computer capabilities at the fingertips of engineers, analysts, statisticians, and other problem-solvers. More "luggable" than portable, the 5100 can serve as a terminal for the System/370 and costs from $9000 to $20,000.

==== 1976 ====
- Space Shuttle: The Enterprise, the first vehicle in the U.S. Space Shuttle program, makes its debut at Palmdale, California, carrying IBM AP-101 flight computers and special hardware built by IBM.
- Laser printer: The first IBM 3800 printer is installed. The 3800 is the first commercial printer to combine laser technology and electrophotography. The technology speeds the printing of bank statements, premium notices, and other high-volume documents, and remains a workhorse for billing and accounts receivable departments.

==== 1977 ====
- Data Encryption Standard: IBM-developed Data Encryption Standard (DES), a cryptographic algorithm, is adopted by the U.S. National Bureau of Standards as a national standard.

==== 1979 ====
- Retail checkout: IBM develops the Universal Product Code (UPC) in the 1970s as a method for embedding pricing and identification information on individual retail items. In 1979, IBM applies holographic scanner technology in IBM's supermarket checkout station to read the UPC stripes on merchandise, one of the first major commercial uses of holography. IBM's support of the UPC concept helps lead to its widespread acceptance by retail and other industries worldwide.
- Thin film recording heads: Instead of using hand-wound wire structures as coils for inductive elements, IBM researchers substitute thin film "wires" patterned by optical lithography. This leads to higher performance recording heads at a reduced cost and establishes IBM's leadership in "areal density": storing the most data in the least space. The result is higher-capacity and higher-performance disk drives.
- Overcoming barriers to technology use: Since 1946, with its announcement of Chinese and Arabic ideographic character typewriters, IBM has worked to overcome cultural and physical barriers to the use of technology. As part of these ongoing efforts, IBM introduces the 3270 Kanji Display Terminal; the System/34 Kanji System with an ideographic feature, which processes more than 11,000 Japanese and Chinese characters; and the Audio Typing Unit for sight-impaired typists.
- First multi-function copier/printer: A communication-enabled laser printer and photocopier combination was introduced, the IBM 6670 Information Distributor. This was the first multi-function (copier/printer) device for the office market.

==== 1980 ====
- Thermal conduction modules: IBM introduces the 3081 processor, the company's most powerful to date, which features Thermal Conduction Modules. In 1990, the Institute of Electrical and Electronics Engineers, Inc., awards its 1990 Corporate Innovation Recognition to IBM for the development of the Multilayer Ceramic Thermal Conduction Module for high performance computers.
- Reduced instruction set computing (RISC) architecture: IBM successfully builds the first prototype computer employing IBM Fellow John Cocke's RISC architecture. RISC simplified the instructions given to computers, making them faster and more powerful. Today, RISC architecture is the basis of most workstations and widely viewed as the dominant computing architecture.

==== 1981 ====
- IBM PC: The IBM Personal Computer goes mass market and helps revolutionize the way the world does business. A year later, Time magazine gives its "Person of the Year" award to the Personal Computer.
- LASIK surgery: Three IBM scientists invent the excimer laser surgical procedure that later forms the basis of LASIK and PRK corrective eye surgeries.

==== 1982 ====
- Antitrust suit: The United States antitrust suit against IBM, filed in 1969, is being dropped by assistant attorney general William F. Baxter as being "without merit". The reasons given were that the government was backing off antitrust actions, IBM also lost its dominance. As was later discovered Baxter failed to disclose that he had been retained as a consultant defending IBM in private antitrust cases.
- Trellis-coded modulation: Trellis-coded modulation (TCM) is first used in voice-band modems to send data at higher rates over telephone channels. Today, TCM is applied in a large variety of terrestrial and satellite-based transmission systems as a key technique for achieving faster and more reliable digital transmission.

==== 1983 ====
- IBM PCjr: IBM announces the widely anticipated PCjr, an attempt to enter the home computing marketplace. The product, however, fails to capture the fancy of consumers due to its lack of compatibility with IBM PC software, its price point, and its unfortunate 'chiclet' keyboard design. IBM terminates the product after 18 months of disappointing sales.
- IBM 3480 magnetic tape system: The industry's most advanced magnetic tape system, the IBM 3480, introduces a new generation of tape drives that replace the familiar reel of tape with an easy-to-handle cartridge. The 3480 was the industry's first tape system to use "thin-film" recording head technology.
- Sexual discrimination: IBM adds sexual orientation to the company's non-discrimination policy. IBM becomes one of the first major companies to make this change.
- ROLM partnership/acquisition: IBM acquires ROLM Corporation for $1.25 billion. Based in Santa Clara, CA (subsequent to an existing partnership), IBM intended to develop digital telephone switches to compete directly with Northern Telecom and AT&T. Two of the most popular systems were the large scale PABX coined ROLM CBX and the smaller PABX coined ROLM Redwood. ROLM is later acquired by Siemens AG in 1989–1992.

==== 1985 ====
- MCI: IBM acquires 18% of MCI Communications, the second-largest long-distance carrier in the United States, in June 1985.
- RP3: Sparked in part by national concerns over losing its technology leadership in the early 1980s, IBM re-enters the supercomputing field with the RP3 (IBM Research Parallel Processor Prototype). IBM researchers worked with scientists from the New York University's Courant Institute of Mathematical Science to design RP3, an experimental computer consisting of up to 512 processors, linked in parallel and connected to as many as two billion characters of main memory. Over the next five years, IBM provides more than $30 million in products and support to a supercomputer facility established at Cornell University in Ithaca, New York.
- Token Ring: IBM's Token Ring technology brings a new level of control to local area networks and quickly becomes an industry standard for networks that connect printers, workstations and servers.

==== 1986 ====
- IBM Almaden Research Center: IBM Research dedicates the Almaden Research Center in California. Today, Almaden is IBM's second-largest laboratory focused on storage systems, technology and computer science.
- Nobel Prize: Scanning tunneling microscopy: IBM Fellows Gerd K. Binnig and Heinrich Rohrer of the IBM Zurich Research Laboratory win the 1986 Nobel Prize in physics for their work in scanning tunneling microscopy. Drs. Binnig and Rohrer are recognized for developing a powerful microscopy technique which makes images of surfaces where individual atoms may be seen.

==== 1987 ====
- Nobel Prize: High-temperature superconductivity: J. Georg Bednorz and IBM Fellow Alex Müller of the IBM Zurich Research Laboratory receive the 1987 Nobel Prize for physics for their breakthrough discovery of high-temperature superconductivity in a new class of materials. They discover superconductivity in ceramic oxides that carry electricity without loss of energy at higher temperatures than any other superconductor.
- Antivirus tools: As personal computers become vulnerable to attack from viruses, a small research group at IBM develops a suite of antivirus tools. The effort leads to the establishment of the High Integrity Computing Laboratory (HICL) at IBM. HICL goes on to pioneer the science of theoretical and observational computer virus epidemiology.
- Special needs access: IBM Researchers demonstrate the feasibility for blind computer users to read information directly from computer screens with the aid of an experimental mouse. And in 1988 the IBM Personal System/2 Screen Reader is announced, permitting blind or visually impaired people to hear the text as it is displayed on the screen in the same way a sighted person would see it. This is the first in the IBM Independence Series of products for computer users with special needs.

==== 1988 ====
- IBM AS/400: IBM introduces the IBM Application System/400, a new family of easy-to-use computers designed for small and intermediate-sized companies. As part of the introduction, IBM and IBM Business Partners worldwide announce the availability of more than 1,000 software packages resulting in the AS/400 becoming a popular business computing system.
- National Science Foundation Network (NSFNET): IBM collaborates with the Merit Network, MCI Communications, the State of Michigan, and the National Science Foundation to upgrade and expand the 56 kbit/s NSFNET to 1.5 Mbit/s (T1) and later 45 Mbit/s (T3). This partnership provides the network infrastructure and lays the groundwork for the explosive growth of the Internet in the 1990s. The NSFNET upgrade boosts network capacity and speed allowing more intensive forms of data, such as the graphics, to travel across the Internet.

==== 1989 ====
- Silicon germanium transistors: The replacing of expensive and exotic materials like gallium arsenide with silicon germanium (known as SiGe), championed by IBM Fellow Bernie Meyerson, creates faster chips at lower costs. Introducing germanium into the base layer of an otherwise all-silicon bipolar transistor allows for improvements in operating frequency, current, noise and power capabilities.

==== 1990 ====
- System/390: IBM introduces the System/390 family. IBM incorporates complementary metal oxide silicon (CMOS) based processors into System/390 Parallel Enterprise Server in 1995. In 1998 the System/390 G5 Parallel Enterprise Server 10-way Turbo model exceeded the 1,000 MIPS barrier.
- RISC System/6000: IBM announces the RISC System/6000, a family of nine workstations that are among the fastest and most powerful in the industry. The RISC System/6000 uses Reduced instruction set computing technology, a computer design pioneered by IBM that simplifies processing steps to speed the execution of commands.
- Moving individual atoms: Donald M. Eigler, a physicist and IBM Fellow at the IBM Almaden Research Center demonstrated the ability to manipulate individual atoms using a scanning tunneling microscope, writing I-B-M using 35 individual xenon atoms.
- Environmental programs: IBM joins 14 U.S. corporations to establish a worldwide program to achieve environmental, health and safety goals by continuously improving environmental management practices and performance. IBM has invested more than $1 billion since 1973 to provide environmental protection for the communities in which IBM facilities are located.

==== 1991 ====
- Services business: IBM reenters the computer services business through the formation of the Integrated Systems Solution Corporation. Despite being in compliance with the provisions of the 1956 Consent Decree, in four years ISSC becomes the second largest provider of computer services. The new business becomes one of IBM's primary revenue streams.

==== 1992 ====
- Personal computer division divestiture. IBM combines and spins off their various non-mainframe and non-midrange, personal computer manufacturing divisions into an autonomous wholly owned subsidiary known as the IBM Personal Computer Company (IBM PC Co.) following a fierce price war in the PC market leading to shrinking profit margins for IBM. This restructuring is one of the largest and most expensive in history.

== 1993–2018: IBM's near disaster and rebirth ==
Year	Gross income (in $m)	Employees
1985	50,050	405,535
1990	69,010	373,816
1995	71,940	225,347
2000	85,090	316,303
2005	91,400	329,373
2010	99,870	426,751

In April 1993, IBM hired Louis V. Gerstner Jr. as its new CEO. For the first time since 1914 IBM had recruited a leader from outside its ranks. Gerstner had been chairman and CEO of RJR Nabisco for four years, and had previously spent 11 years as a top executive at American Express. Gerstner brought with him a customer-oriented sensibility and the strategic-thinking expertise that he had honed through years as a management consultant at McKinsey & Co. Recognizing that his first priority was to stabilize the company, he adopted a triage mindset and took quick action. His early decisions included recommitting to the mainframe, selling the Federal Systems Division to Loral in order to replenish the company's cash coffers, continuing to shrink the workforce (reaching a low of 220,000 employees in 1994), and driving significant cost reductions within the company. Most importantly, Gerstner decided to reverse the move to spin off IBM business units into separate companies. He recognized that one of IBM's strengths was its ability to provide integrated solutions for customers – more than piece parts or components. Splitting the company would have destroyed that IBM advantage.

These initial steps worked. In 1994 IBM turned a profit of $3 billion. Stabilization was not Gerstner's endgame – the restoration of IBM's once great reputation was. To do that, he needed a winning business strategy. Over the next decade, Gerstner shed commodity businesses and focused on high-margin opportunities. IBM divested itself of low margin industries (DRAM, IBM Network, personal printers, and hard drives).

By building upon the decision to keep the company whole, IBM built a global services business and a reputation as a technology integrator. IBM claimed that the services business became brand agnostic integrating whatever technologies the client required, even if they were from an IBM competitor. IBM augmented this services business with the 2002 acquisition of the consultancy division of PricewaterhouseCoopers for $3.5 billion US.

Another high margin opportunity IBM invested in was software. Starting in 1995 with its acquisition of Lotus Development Corp., IBM built its software portfolio from one brand, IBM DB2, to five: DB2, Lotus, WebSphere, Tivoli, and Rational. Content to leave the consumer applications business to other firms, IBM's software strategy focused on middleware – the vital software that connects operating systems to applications. The middleware business played to IBM's strengths, and its higher margins improved the company's bottom line significantly as the century came to an end.

Not all software that IBM developed was successful. While the operating system OS/2 was arguably technically superior to Microsoft Windows 95, OS/2 sales were largely concentrated in networked computing used by corporate professionals. OS/2 failed to develop much penetration in the consumer and stand-alone desktop PC segments. There were reports that it could not be installed properly on IBM's own Aptiva series of home PCs.

Microsoft made an offer in 1994 stipulating that if IBM ended development of OS/2 completely, then it would receive the same terms as Compaq for a license of Windows 95. IBM refused and instead went with an "IBM First" strategy of promoting OS/2 Warp and disparaging Windows, as IBM aimed to drive sales of its own software and hardware. By 1995, Windows 95 negotiations between IBM and Microsoft, which were difficult, stalled when IBM purchased Lotus Development whose Lotus SmartSuite would have directly competed with Microsoft Office. As a result, IBM received their license later than their competitors which hurt sales of IBM PCs. IBM officials later conceded that OS/2 would not have been a viable operating system to keep them in the PC business.

While IBM hardware and technologies were relatively de-emphasized in Gerstner's three-legged business model, they were not relegated to secondary status. The company brought its research organization to bear more closely on its existing product lines and development processes. While Internet applications and deep computing overtook client servers as key business technology priorities, mainframes returned to relevance. IBM reinvigorated their mainframe line with CMOS technologies, which made them among the most powerful and cost-efficient in the marketplace. Investments in microelectronics research and manufacturing made IBM a world leader in specialized, high margin chip production – it developed 200 mm wafer processes in 1992, and 300 mm wafers within the decade. IBM-designed chips were used in PlayStation 3, Xbox 360, and Wii game consoles. IBM also regained the lead in supercomputing with high-end machines based upon scalable parallel processor technology.

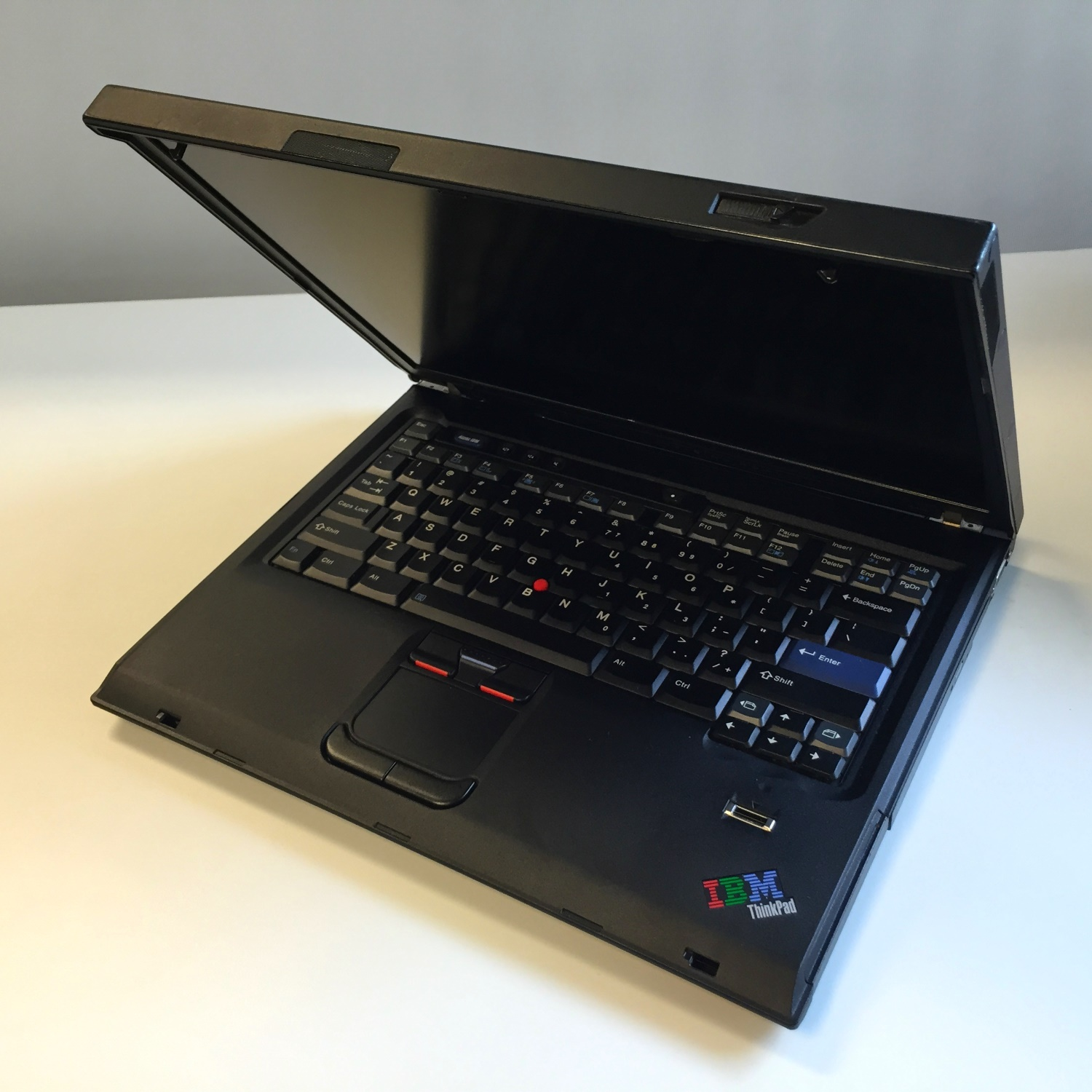
An IBM ThinkPad series laptop

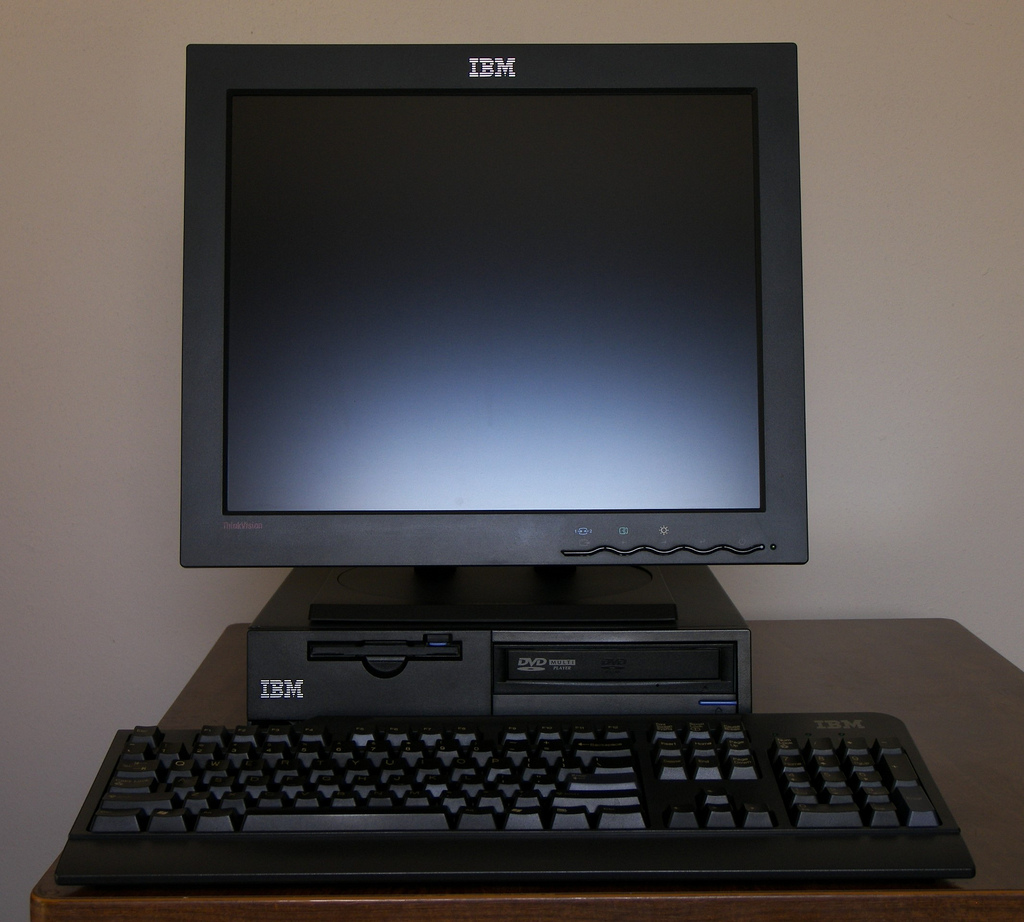
An IBM ThinkCentre series desktop

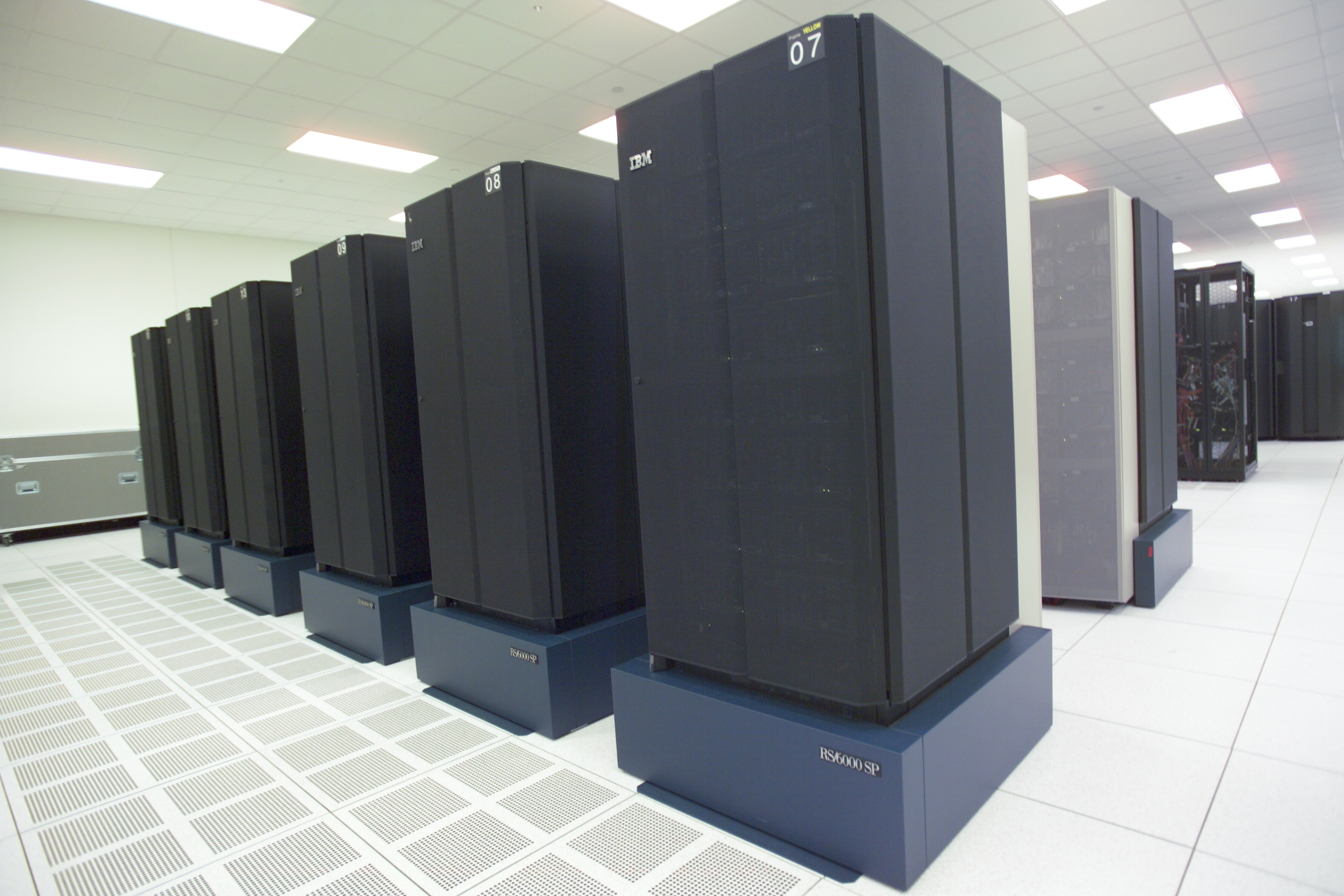
An IBM RS/6000 SP

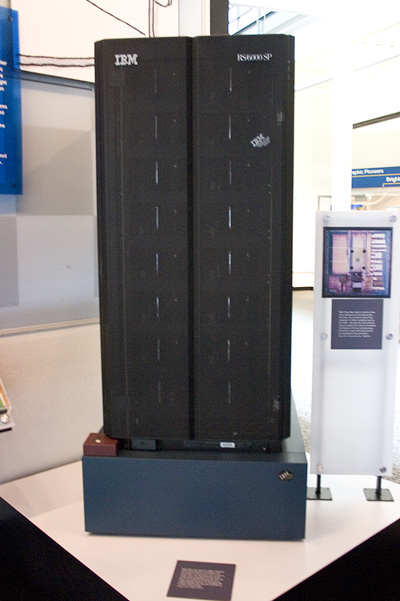
An IBM Deep Blue

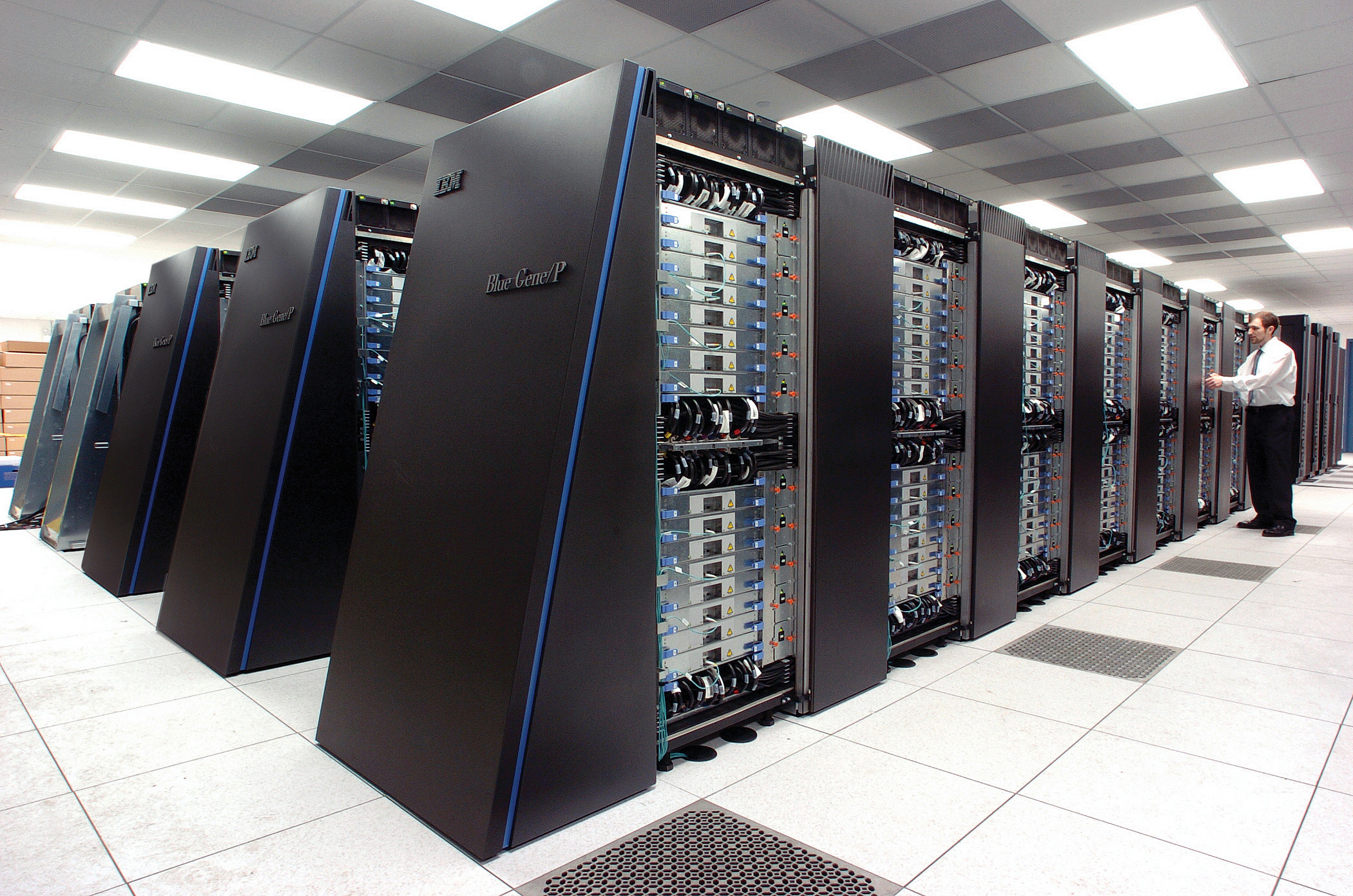
An IBM Blue Gene

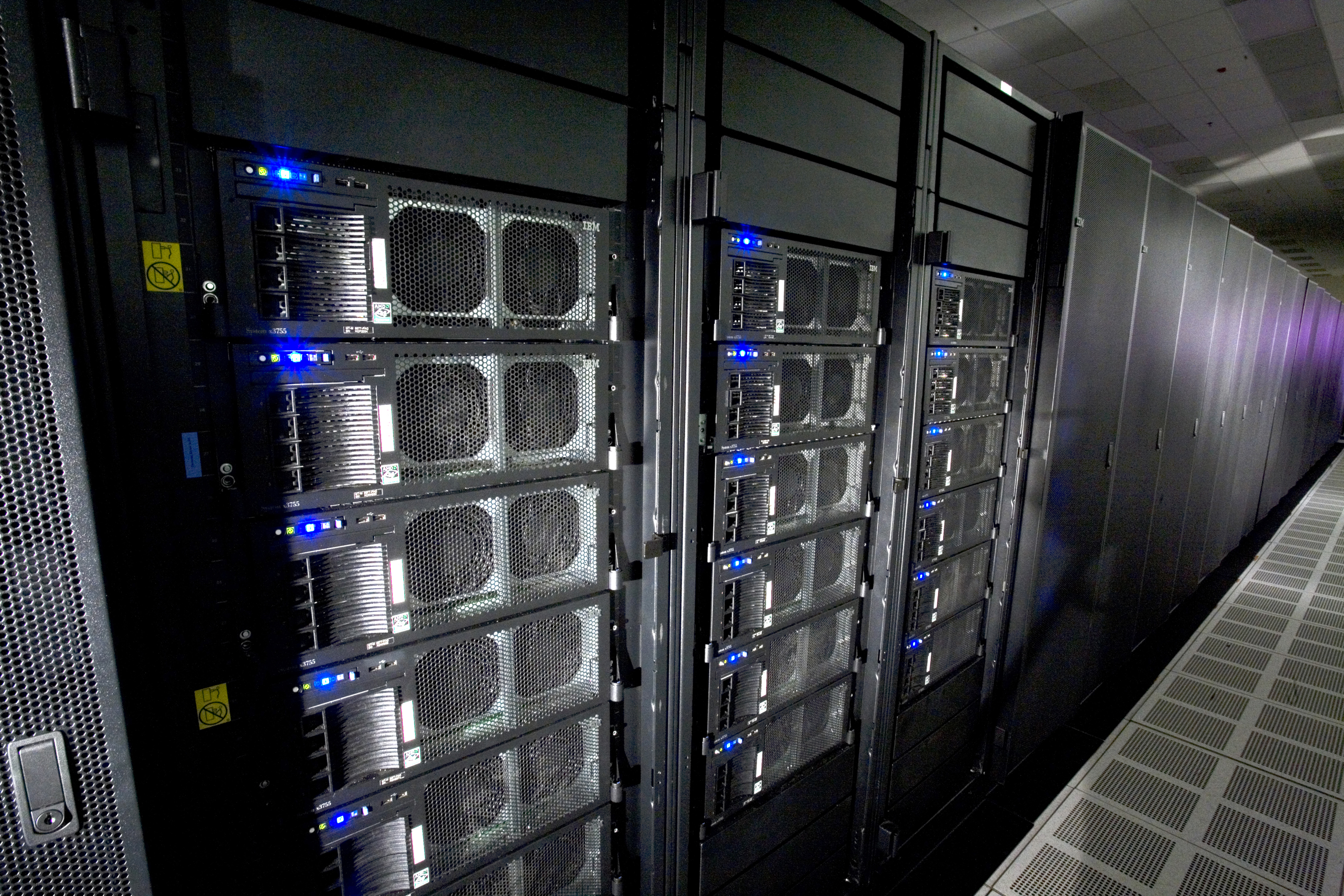
An IBM Roadrunner

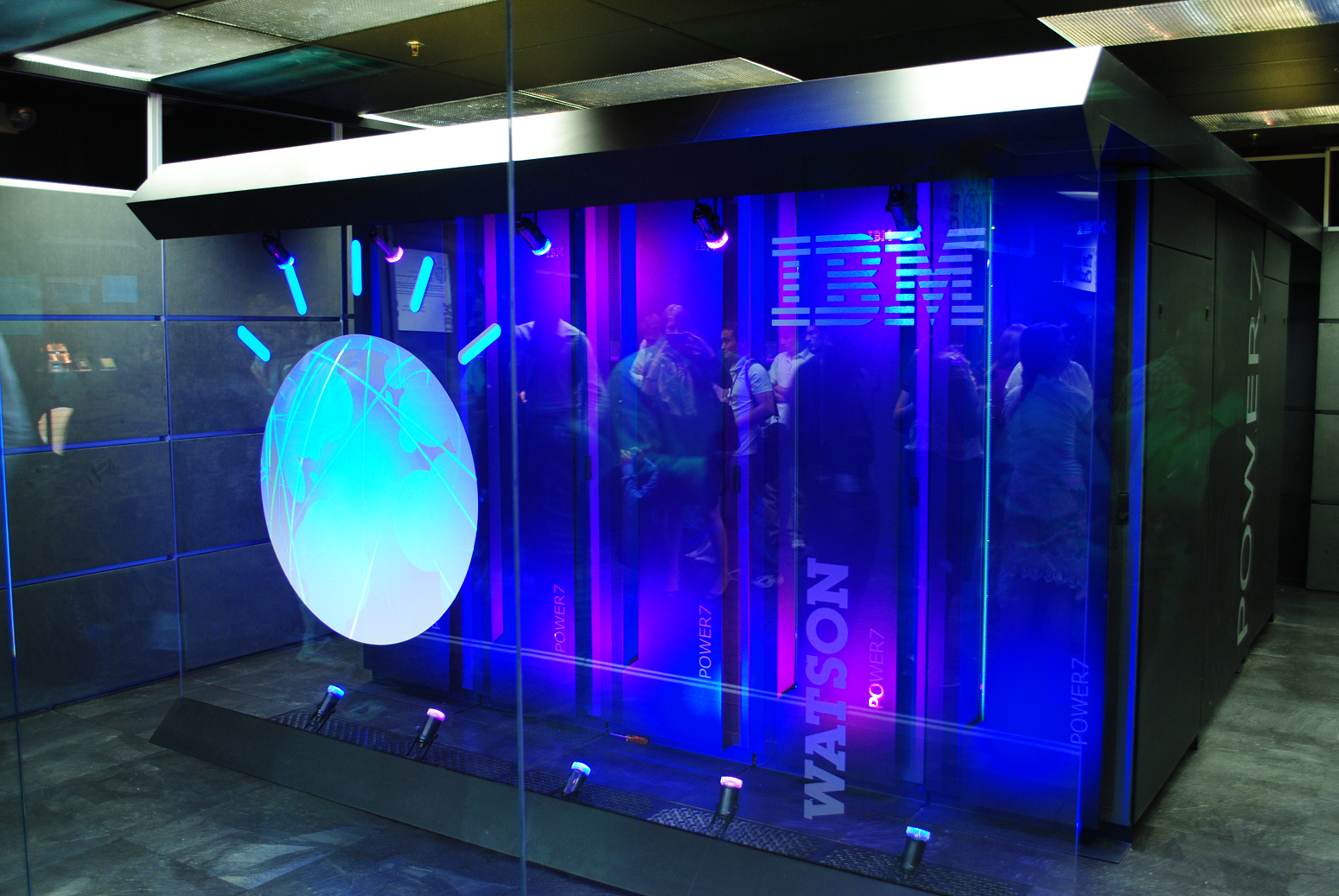
An IBM Watson

Equally significant in IBM's revival was its reentry into the popular mindset. On October 5, 1992, at the COMDEX computer expo, IBM announced the first ThinkPad laptop computer, the 700C. The ThinkPad, a premium machine which then cost US$4350, included a 25 MHz Intel 80486SL processor, a 10.4-inch active matrix display, removable 120 MB hard drive, 4 MB RAM (expandable to 16 MB) and a TrackPoint II pointing device. The design by noted designer Richard Sapper made the ThinkPad successful with the digerati, and the cool factor of the ThinkPad brought back some of the cachet to the IBM brand that was lost in the PC wars of the 1980s. Instrumental to this popular resurgence was the 1997 chess match between IBM's chess-playing computer system Deep Blue and reigning world chess champion Garry Kasparov. Deep Blue's victory was a historic first for a computer over a reigning world champion. Also helping the company reclaim its position as a technology leader was its annual domination of supercomputer rankings and patent leadership statistics. Ironically, a contributor in reviving the company's reputation was the Dot-com bubble collapse in 2000, where many of the edgy technology high flyers of the 1990s failed to survive the downturn. These collapses discredited some of the more fashionable Internet-driven business models that IBM was previously compared against.

Another factor was the company's revival of the IBM brand. The company's marketing during the economic downturn was chaotic, presenting different, sometimes discordant voices in the marketplace. This brand chaos was attributable in part to the company having 70 different advertising agencies in its employ. In 1994, IBM consolidated its advertising in one agency. The result was a coherent, consistent message to the marketplace.

As IBM recovered its financial footing, it sought to redefine the Internet age in ways that played to traditional IBM strengths, couching the discussion in business-centric manners with initiatives like e-commerce and On Demand. It supported open source initiatives, forming ventures with partners and competitors alike.

The company also revamped its philanthropic practices to bring focus on improving K-12 education. It ended its 40-year technology partnership with the International Olympic Committee after a successful engagement at the 2000 Olympic Games in Sydney, Australia. On the human resources front, IBM adopted and integrated diversity principles and practices ahead of the industry. It added sexual orientation to its non-discrimination practices in 1984, in 1995 created executive diversity task forces, and in 1996 offered domestic partner benefits to its employees. The company is listed as among the best places for employees, employees of color, and women to work. And in 1996, the Women in Technology International Hall of Fame inducted three IBM employees as part of its inaugural class of 10 women: Ruth Leach Amonette, the first woman to hold an executive position at IBM; Barbara Grant, PhD, first woman to be named an IBM site general manager; and Linda Sanford, the highest-placed technical woman in IBM. Fran Allen – a software pioneer for her innovative work in compilers over the decades – was inducted in 1997.

In 1998, IBM merged the enterprise-oriented Personal Systems Group of the IBM PC Co. into IBM's own Global Services personal computer consulting and customer service division. The resulting merged business units then became known simply as IBM Personal Systems Group. A year later, IBM stopped selling their computers at retail outlets after their market share in this sector had fallen considerably behind competitors Compaq and Dell. Immediately afterwards, the IBM PC Co. was dissolved and merged into IBM Personal Systems Group.

Gerstner retired at the end of 2002, and was replaced by long-time IBMer Samuel J. Palmisano.

In 2005, the company sold all of its personal computer business to Chinese technology company Lenovo and, in 2009, it acquired software company SPSS Inc. Later in 2009, IBM's Blue Gene supercomputing program was awarded the National Medal of Technology and Innovation by U.S. President Barack Obama. In 2011, IBM gained worldwide attention for its artificial intelligence program Watson, which was exhibited on Jeopardy! where it won against game-show champions Ken Jennings and Brad Rutter. The company also celebrated its 100th anniversary in the same year on June 16. In 2012, IBM announced it had agreed to buy Kenexa and Texas Memory Systems, and a year later it also acquired SoftLayer Technologies, a web hosting service, in a deal worth around $2 billion. Also that year, the company designed a video surveillance system for Davao City.

In 2014, IBM announced it would sell its x86 server division to Lenovo for $2.1 billion. while continuing to offer Power ISA-based servers.

=== Key events ===
==== 1993 ====
- IBM misreads two significant trends in the computer industry: personal computers and client-server computing: and as a result loses more than $8 billion in 1993, its third straight year of billion-dollar losses. Since 1991, the company lost $16 billion, and many feel IBM is no longer a viable player in the industry.
- Louis V. Gerstner Jr. Gerstner arrives as IBM's chairman and CEO on April 1, 1993. For the first time since the arrival of Thomas J. Watson Sr., in 1914, IBM has a leader pulled from outside its ranks. Gerstner had been chairman and CEO of RJR Nabisco for four years and had previously spent 11 years as a top executive at American Express.
- IBM RS/6000 SP system. IBM introduces the Scalable POWERparallel System, the first in a family of microprocessor-based supercomputers using RS/6000 technology. IBM pioneers scalable parallel system technology of joining smaller, mass-produced computer processors rather than relying on one larger, custom-designed processor. Complex queries could then be broken down into a series of smaller jobs that are run concurrently ("in parallel") to speed their completion.

==== 1994 ====
- IBM reports a profit for the year, its first since 1990. Over the next few years, the company focuses less on its traditional strengths in hardware, and more on services, software, and its ability to craft technology solutions.
- IBM RAMAC Array Storage Family: With features like highly parallel processing, multi-level cache, RAID 5, and redundant components, RAMAC advances information storage technology. Consisting of the RAMAC Array Direct Access Storage Device (DASD) and the RAMAC Array Subsystem, almost 2,000 systems shipped to customers in its first three months of availability.
- Speech recognition: IBM releases the IBM Personal Dictation System (IPDS), the first wave of speech recognition products for the personal computer. It is later renamed VoiceType, and its capabilities are expanded to include control of computer applications and desktops simply by talking to them, without touching a keyboard. In 1997 IBM announces ViaVoice Gold, software that provides a hands-free way to dictate text and navigate the desktop using natural, continuous speech.

==== 1995 ====
- Lotus Development Corporation acquisition: IBM acquires the outstanding shares of the Lotus Development Corporation, whose Notes software improves collaboration across an enterprise and whose acquisition makes IBM the world's largest software company.
- Glueball calculation: IBM scientists complete a two-year calculation – the largest single numerical calculation in the history of computing – to pin down the properties of an elusive elementary particle called a "glueball". The calculation was carried out on GF11, a massively parallel computer at the IBM Thomas J. Watson Research Center.

==== 1996 ====
- IBM Austin Research Laboratory opens: Based in Austin, Texas, the lab is focused on advanced circuit design as well as new design techniques and tools for very high performance microprocessors.
- Atlanta Olympics: IBM suffers a highly public embarrassment when its IT support of the Olympic Games in Atlanta experiences technical difficulties.
- Domestic partner benefits: IBM announces Domestic Partner Benefits for gay and lesbian employees.

==== 1997 ====
- Deep Blue: The 32-node IBM RS/6000 SP supercomputer, Deep Blue, defeats World Chess Champion Garry Kasparov in the first known instance of a computer beating a reigning world champion chess player in a tournament-style competition.
- eBusiness: IBM coins the term and defined an enormous new industry by using the Internet as a medium for real business and institutional transformation. e-business becomes synonymous with doing business in the Internet age.

==== 1998 ====
- CMOS Gigaprocessor: IBM unveils the first microprocessor that runs at 1 billion cycles per second. IBM scientists develop new Silicon on insulator chips to be used in the construction of a mainstream processor. The breakthrough ushers in new circuit designs and product groups.

==== 1999 ====
- Blue Gene: IBM Research starts a computer architecture cooperative project with the Lawrence Livermore National Laboratory, the United States Department of Energy (which is partially funding the project), and academia to build new supercomputers (4) capable of more than one quadrillion operations per second (one petaflop). Nicknamed "Blue Gene", the new supercomputers perform 500 times faster than other powerful supercomputers and can simulate folding complex proteins.

==== 2000 ====
- Quantum mirage nanotechnology: IBM scientists discover a way to transport information on the atomic scale using electrons instead of conventional wiring. This new phenomenon, called the quantum mirage effect, may enable data transfer within future nanoscale electronic circuits too small to use wires. The quantum mirage technique can send information through solid forms and could do away with wiring that connects nanocircuit components.
- ASCI White: IBM delivers the world's most powerful computer to the US Department of Energy, powerful enough to process an Internet transaction for every person on Earth in less than a minute. IBM built the supercomputer to test the safety and effectiveness of the nation's aging nuclear weapons stockpile. This computer is 1,000 times more powerful than Deep Blue, the supercomputer that beat Garry Kasparov in chess in 1997.
- Flexible transistors: IBM creates flexible transistors, combining organic and inorganic materials as a medium for semiconductors. By eliminating the limitations of etching computer circuits in silicon, flexible transistors make it possible to create a new generation of inexpensive computer displays that can be embedded into curved plastic or other materials.
- Sydney Olympics: After its successful engagement at the 2000 Olympic games in Sydney, IBM ends its 40-year technology partnership with the International Olympic Committee.

==== 2001 ====
- The book IBM and the Holocaust written by Edwin Black is released. The book accuses IBM of having knowingly assisted Nazi authorities in the perpetuation of the Holocaust through the provision of tabulating products and services. Several lawsuits are later filed against IBM by Holocaust victims seeking restitution for their suffering and losses. All lawsuits related to this issue were eventually dropped without recovery.
- Carbon nanotube transistors: IBM researchers build the world's first transistors out of carbon nanotubes – tiny cylinders of carbon atoms that are 500 times smaller than silicon-based transistors and 1,000 times stronger than steel. The breakthrough is thought to be an important step in finding materials that can be used to build computer chips when silicon-based chips can't be made smaller.
- Low power initiative: IBM launches its low-power initiative to improve the energy efficiency of IT and accelerates the development of ultra-low power components and power-efficient servers, storage systems, personal computers and ThinkPad notebook computers.
- Greater density & chip speeds: IBM is first to mass-produce computer hard disk drives using a revolutionary new type of magnetic coating – "pixie dust" – that eventually quadruples data density of current hard disk drive products. IBM also unveils "strained silicon", a breakthrough that alters silicon to boost chip speeds by up to 35 percent.

==== 2002 ====
- IBM's hard disk drive business is sold to Hitachi.

==== 2003 ====
- Blue Gene/L: The Blue Gene team unveils a proto-type of its Blue Gene/L computer roughly the size of a standard dishwasher that ranks as the 73rd most powerful supercomputer in the world. This cubic meter machine is a small scale model of the full Blue Gene/L built for the Lawrence Livermore National Laboratory in California, which will be 128 times larger when it's unveiled two years later.

==== 2005 ====
- Cancer research: IBM joins forces with Memorial Sloan-Kettering Cancer Center (MSKCC), the Molecular Profiling Institute and the CHU Sainte-Justine Research Center to collaborate on cancer research by building state-of-the-art integrated information management systems.
- Acquisition of the IBM PC business by Lenovo: The low-margin PC division (including ThinkPads and ThinkCentres) was acquired by the Chinese manufacturer, Lenovo.

==== 2006 ====
- Translation software: IBM delivers an advanced speech-to-speech translation system to U.S. forces in Iraq using bidirectional English to Arabic translation software that improves communication between military personnel and Iraqi forces and citizens. The software helps offset the shortage of military linguists.

==== 2007 ====
- Renewable energy: IBM is recognized by the US EPA for its green power purchases in the US and for its support and participation in EPA's Fortune 500 Green Power Challenge. IBM ranked 12th on the EPA's list of Green Power Partners for 2007. IBM purchased enough renewable energy in 2007 to meet 4% of its US electricity use and 9% of its global electricity purchases. IBM's commitment to green power helps cut greenhouse gas emissions.
- River watch using IBM Stream Computing: The Beacon Institute and IBM create the first technology-based river monitoring network. The River and Estuary Observatory Network (REON) allows for minute-to-minute monitoring of New York's Hudson River via an integrated network of sensors, robotics and computational technology. This project is made possible by IBM's "Stream Computing", a new computer architecture that can examine thousands of information sources to help scientists better understand what is happening as it happens.
- IBM has been granted more US patents than any other company. From 1993 to 2007, IBM was awarded over 38,000 US patents and has invested about $5 billion annually in research, development, and engineering since 1996. IBM's active portfolio is about 26,000 patents in the US and over 40,000 patents worldwide is a direct result of that investment.

==== 2008 ====
- IBM Roadrunner: For the ninth consecutive time, IBM takes the No.1 ranking of the world's most powerful supercomputers with its computer built for the Roadrunner project at Los Alamos National Laboratory. It is the first in the world to operate at speeds faster than one quadrillion calculations per second and remains the world speed champion for over a year. The Los Alamos system is twice as energy-efficient as the No. 2 computer at the time, using about half the electricity to maintain the same level of computing power.
- Green power: IBM opens its "greenest" data center in Boulder, Colorado. The energy-efficient facility is part of a $350 million investment by IBM to help meet customer demand for reducing energy costs. The new data center includes high-density computing systems with virtualization technology that reduce data center carbon footprint.

==== 2011 ====
- Watson: IBM's supercomputer Watson wins on the TV game show Jeopardy! against Ken Jennings and Brad Rutter. The competition was presented by PBS.
- June 16, 2011: 100th anniversary: Mark Krantz and Jon Swartz in USA Today state "It has remained at the forefront through the decades ... the fifth-most-valuable U.S. company [today] ... demonstrated a strength shared by most 100-year-old companies: the ability to change. ...survived not only the Depression and several recessions, but technological shifts and intense competition as well."

==== 2014 ====
- Lenovo acquires IBM's x86-based server (System x) business for US$2.3 billion, in a sale completed October 1, 2014.

==== 2015 ====
- IBM Watson Health: In April 2015, IBM Watson Health is created largely through a series of acquisitions with the intention of using Watson in healthcare. A 2021 post from the Association for Computing Machinery (ACM) titled "What Happened To Watson Health?" described the portfolio management challenges.

==== 2018 ====
- Red Hat acquisition for $34 billion: IBM announces its intent to acquire Red Hat for US$34 billion on October 28, 2018, in one of its largest-ever acquisitions. The company will operate out of IBM's Hybrid Cloud division.

== 2019–present ==
The 2019 acquisition of Red Hat enabled IBM to change its focus on future platforms, according to IBM Chief Executive Arvind Krishna.

In October 2020, IBM announced it is splitting itself into two public companies. IBM will focus on high-margin cloud computing and artificial intelligence, built on the foundation of the 2019 Red Hat acquisition. The legacy Managed Infrastructure Services unit will be spun off into a new public company Kyndryl to manage clients' IT infrastructure and accounts, and have 4,600 clients in 115 countries, with a backlog of $60 billion. This was IBM's largest divestiture so far, and was welcomed by investors.

On January 21, 2022, IBM announced that it would sell Watson Health to the private equity firm Francisco Partners. In July 2022, IBM announced the acquisition of Databand, a data observability software developer, for an undisclosed amount. Following the acquisition, Databand employees will join IBM's data and AI division.

In December 2022, it was announced IBM had acquired the Reston-headquartered digital transformation and IT modernization services provider, Octo Consulting from Arlington Capital Partners for an undisclosed price. IBM also signed a partnership with new Japanese 2 nm process manufacturing company Rapidus.

In August 2023, IBM announced that it would sell The Weather Company to private equity firm Francisco Partners.

== Twentieth-century market power and antitrust ==
IBM dominated the electronic data processing market for most of the 20th century, initially controlling over 70 percent of the punch card and tabulating machine market and then achieving a similar share in the computer market. IBM asserted that its successes in achieving and maintaining such market share were due to its skill, industry and foresight; governments and competitors asserted that the maintenance of such large shares was at least in part due to anti-competitive acts such as unfair prices, terms and conditions, tying, product manipulations and creating FUD (Fear, Uncertainty and Doubt) related to its competitors, in the marketplace. IBM was thus the defendant in more than twenty government and private antitrust actions during the 20th century. IBM lost only one of these matters but did settle others in ways that profoundly shaped the industry as summarized below. By the end of the 20th century, IBM was no longer so dominant in the computer industry. Some observers suggest management's attention to the many antitrust lawsuits of the 1970s was at least in part responsible for its decline.

=== 1936 Consent Decree ===
In 1932, U.S. Government prosecutors asserted as anti-competition tying IBM's practice of requiring customers who leased its tabulating equipment to purchase punched cards used on such equipment. IBM lost the lawsuit and in the resulting 1936 consent decree, IBM agreed to no longer require only IBM cards and agreed to assist alternative suppliers of cards in starting production facilities that would compete with IBM's; thereby create a separate market for the punched cards and in effect for subsequent computer supplies such as magnetic tapes and disk packs.

=== 1956 Consent Decree ===
On January 21, 1952, the U.S. Government filed a lawsuit which resulted in a consent decree entered as a final judgment on January 25, 1956. The government's goal to increase competition in the data processing industry was effected through several provisions in the decree:

- IBM was required to sell equipment on terms that would not place purchasers at a disadvantage with respect to customers leasing the same equipment from IBM. Prior to this decree, IBM had only rented its equipment. This created markets both for used IBM equipment and enabled lease financing of IBM equipment by third parties (leasing companies).
- IBM was required to provide parts and information to independent maintainers of purchased IBM equipment, enabling and creating a demand for such hardware maintenance services.
- IBM was required to sell data processing services through a subsidiary that could be treated no differently than any company independent of IBM, enabling competition in the data processing services business.
- IBM was required to grant non-exclusive, non-transferable, worldwide licenses for any and all patents at reasonable royalty rates to anyone, provided the licensee cross-licensed its patents to IBM on similar terms. This removed IBM patents as a barrier to competition in the data processing industry and enabled the emergence of manufacturers of equipment plug compatible to IBM equipment.

While the decree did little to limit IBM's future dominance of the then-nascent computer industry, it did enable competition in segments such as leasing, services, maintenance, and equipment attachable to IBM systems and reduced barriers to entry through mandatory reasonable patent cross-licensing.

The decree's terms remained in effect until 1996; they were phased out over the next five years.

=== 1968–1984 Multiple government and private antitrust complaints ===
In 1968 the first of a series of antitrust suits against IBM was filed by Control Data Corp (CDC). It was followed in 1969 by the US government's antitrust complaint, then by 19 private US antitrust complaints and one European complaint. In the end IBM settled a few of these matters but mainly won. The US government's case sustained by four US Presidents and their Attorneys General was dropped as "without merit" in 1982 by William Baxter, US President Reagans' Assistant Attorney General in charge of the Antitrust Division of the U.S. Department of Justice.

==== 1968–1973 Control Data Corp. v. IBM ====
CDC filed an antitrust lawsuit against IBM in Minnesota's federal court alleging that IBM had monopolized the market for computers in violation of section 2 of the Sherman Antitrust Act by among other things announcing products it could not deliver. A 1965 internal IBM memo by an IBM attorney noted that Control Data had publicly blamed its declining earnings on IBM, "and its frequent model and price changes. There was some sentiment that the charges were true." In 1973 IBM settled the CDC case for about $80 million in cash and the transfer of assets including the IBM Service Bureau Corporation to CDC.

==== 1969–1982 U.S. v. IBM ====
On January 17, 1969, the United States of America filed a complaint in the United States District Court for the Southern District of New York, alleging that IBM violated Section 2 of the Sherman Antitrust Act by monopolizing or attempting to monopolize the general-purpose electronic digital computer system market, specifically computers designed primarily for business. Subsequently, the US government alleged IBM violated the antitrust laws in IBM's actions directed against leasing companies and plug-compatible peripheral manufacturers.

In June 1969 IBM unbundled its software and services in what many observers believed was in anticipation of and a direct result of the 1969 US Antitrust lawsuit. Overnight a competitive software market was created.

Among the major violations asserted were:

- Anticompetitive price discrimination such as giving away software services.
- Bundling of software with "related computer hardware equipment" for a single price.
- Predatorily priced and preannounced specific hardware "fighting machines".
- Developed and announced specific hardware products primarily for the purpose of discouraging customers from acquiring competing products.
- Announced certain future products knowing that it was unlikely to be able to ship such products within the announced time frame.
- Engaged in below cost and discount conduct in selected markets in order to injure peripheral manufacturers and leasing companies.

It was in some ways one of the great single firm monopoly cases of all times. IBM produced 30 million pages of materials during discovery; it submitted its executives to a series of pretrial depositions. Trial began six years after the complaint was filed and then it battled in court for another six years. The trial transcript contains over 104,400 pages with thousands of documents placed in the record. It ended on January 8, 1982, when William Baxter, the then Assistant Attorney General in charge of the Antitrust Division of the Department of Justice dropped the case as "without merit".

==== 1969–1981 Private antitrust lawsuits ====
The U.S.'s 1969 antitrust lawsuit was followed by about 18 private antitrust complaints all but one of which IBM ultimately won. Some notable lawsuits include:

===== Greyhound Computer Corp. =====
Greyhound, a leasing company, filed a case under Illinois' state antitrust law in Illinois state court. This case went to trial in federal court in 1972 in Arizona with a directed verdict for IBM on the antitrust claims; however, the court of appeals in 1977 reversed the decision. Just before the retrial was to start in January 1981, IBM and Greyhound settled the case for $17.7 million.

===== Telex Corp. =====
Telex, a peripherals equipment manufacturer, filed suit on January 21, 1972, charging that IBM had monopolized and had attempted to monopolize the worldwide manufacture, distribution, sales, and leasing of electronic data processing equipment including the relevant submarket of plug-compatible peripheral devices. After a non-jury trial in 1973, IBM was found guilty "possessing and exercising monopoly power" over the "plug-compatible peripheral equipment market", and ordered to pay triple damages of $352.5‐million and other relief including disclosure of peripheral interface specifications. Separately Telex was found guilty of misappropriated IBM trade secrets. The judgment against IBM was overturned on appeal and on October 4, 1975, both parties announced they were terminating their actions against each other.

===== Other private lawsuits =====
Other private lawsuits ultimately won by IBM include California Computer Products Inc., Memorex Corp., Marshall Industries, Hudson General Corp., Transamerica Corporation and Forro Precision, Inc.

==== 1980–1984 European Union ====
The European Economic Community Commission on Monopolies initiated proceedings against IBM under article 86 of the Treaty of Rome for exploiting its domination of the continent's computer business and abusing its dominant market position by engaging in business practices designed to protect its position against plug-compatible manufacturers. The case was settled in 1984 with IBM agreeing to change its business practices with regard to disclosure of device interface information.

== Products and technologies ==
See List of IBM products

=== Evolution of IBM's operating systems ===
IBM operating systems have paralleled hardware development. On early systems, operating systems represented a relatively modest level of investment, and were essentially viewed as an adjunct to the hardware. By the time of the System/360, however, operating systems had assumed a much larger role, in terms of cost, complexity, importance, and risk.

=== High-level languages ===
Early IBM computer systems, like those from many other vendors, were programmed using assembly language. Computer science efforts through the 1950s and early 1960s led to the development of many new high-level languages (HLL) for programming. IBM played a complicated role in this process. Hardware vendors were naturally concerned about the implications of portable languages that would allow customers to pick and choose among vendors without compatibility problems. IBM, in particular, helped create barriers that tended to lock customers into a single platform.

Nevertheless, IBM had a significant role in the following major computer languages:

- FORTRAN – for years, the dominant language for mathematics and scientific programming
- PL/I – an attempt to create a "be all and end all" language
- COBOL – eventually the ubiquitous, standard language for business applications
- APL – an early interactive language with a mathematical notation
- PL/S – an internal systems programming language proprietary to IBM
- RPG – an acronym for 'Report Program Generator', developed on the IBM 1401 to produce reports from data files. General Systems Division enhanced the language to HLL status on its midrange systems to rival COBOL.
- SQL – a relational query language developed for IBM's System R; now the standard RDBMS query language
- Rexx – a macro and scripting language based on PL/I syntax originally developed for Conversational Monitor System (CMS) and authored by IBM Fellow Mike Cowlishaw

=== IBM and AIX/UNIX/Linux/SCO ===
IBM developed an inconsistent relationship with the UNIX and Linux worlds. The importance of IBM's large computer business placed pressures on all of IBM's attempts to develop other lines of business. All IBM projects faced the risk of being seen as competing against company priorities. This was because, for example, if a customer decided to build an application on an RS/6000 platform, this also meant that a decision had been made against the highly profitable and entrenched mainframe platform. So despite having some excellent technology, IBM often placed itself in a compromised position.

A case in point is IBM's GFIS products for infrastructure management and GIS applications. Despite long having a dominant position in such industries as electric, gas, and water utilities, IBM stumbled in the 1990s trying to build workstation-based solutions to replace its existing mainframe-based products. Some customers moved to new technologies from other vendors; many felt betrayed by IBM.

While IBM better embraced open source technologies in the 1990s, it later became embroiled in a complex litigation with SCO group over intellectual property rights related to the UNIX and Linux platforms.

== See also ==
- Category IBM articles
- History of IBM magnetic disk drives
- Pre-WW2 list of IBM subsidiaries
