= James Bryce =

James Bryce may refer to:

- James Bryce (geologist) (1806–1877), Irish naturalist and geologist
- James Bryce (footballer) (1884–1916), Scottish footballer
- James Bryce, 1st Viscount Bryce (1838–1922), British jurist, historian and politician
- James W. Bryce (1880–1949), North American inventor and pioneer in magnetic data recording
