= James W. Bryce =

American engineer & inventor (1880–1949)

James Wares Bryce (1880 – 1949) was an American engineer and inventor. In 1936, on the centenary of the United States Patent Office, he was honored as one of the country’s 10 greatest living inventors.

Born in New York City on September 5, 1880, his father was from Edinburgh and mother was from Wick. He studied for three years at City College of New York before taking a draftsman position in 1900. In 1903 he worked for J. Walter Christie and helped develop a front-wheel-drive racing car. In 1904 he went to work for H. T. Goss, who later formed the partnership of Goss & Bryce. One of their contracts was with Bundy Manufacturing Company who made time clocks used to track hours worked by industrial workers. He took a position at the Computing-Tabulating-Recording Company (later known as IBM) in 1917 as supervising engineer of the division that developed time recording machines.

Time clocks used punched cards to record workers in and out times. Subtracting these two gave hours worked on each day, and adding them all up gave total work time. This was easily automated by mechanical machines. However, to compute wages, the hours must be multiplied by salary per hour. Bryce invented one of the first electromechanical multipliers using relays for this application, and became IBM's chief engineer. In 1937 Bryce was approached by Howard Aiken of Harvard University, who persuaded IBM to fund a programmable calculator which became the Automatic Sequence Controlled Calculator (ASCC), better known as the Harvard Mark I.

When Aiken published a press release announcing the ASCC. Bryce was the only IBM person mentioned. In 1946 Bryce designed the first commercial electronic multiplier using vacuum tubes, which IBM marketed as the IBM 603. He adapted the 603 to become the arithmetic logic unit in the Selective Sequence Electronic Calculator (SSEC). However, he was too ill to attend the dedication of the SSEC in January 1948, and died in March 1949.
