= Alexander Shiels =

Scots medical practitioner and inventor

Alexander Shiels (1865–1907) was a Scottish medical practitioner, inventor, and aspiring industrialist. He was an instigator and promoter in the Kosmoid affair, one of Scotland's most bizarre financial scandals, in which prominent businessmen and other investors lost large amounts of money. Shiels was also one of the few proponents of alchemy in the twentieth century. A 1911 novel The Gold Makers, written under a pseudonym by one of his Scottish investors, purportedly re-tells Shiels' story in fictional form.

Shiels achieved modest uptake with some of his inventions, including the "Thistle Mechanical Milking Machine" (1895), "Kosmoid" time recorders (c. 1904) and the Kosmoid Tube Works (1904 onwards), which continued until 1997, first as the Dumbarton Weldless Tube Company, and later as the Dumbarton tube making operation of the American firm Babcock & Wilcox.

== Early life and career ==
Born in 1865 at Earlston, Berwickshire in Scotland, Shiels grew up with his mother in Glasgow where he attended school and then Glasgow University. He graduated with a Bachelor of Medicine and Master of Surgery in 1890 and a BSc in biological sciences in 1891. He obtained certificates in chemistry studying under Professor John Ferguson, who included the history of alchemy among his personal interests. While at University, Shiels showed an interest in engineering, collaborating with his uncle, William Elliot of Lanark on the development of novel milking machinery. Between 1891 and 1902 he successfully obtained 16 patents under his name, the majority concerned with improvements to milking machinery. With Elliot, he developed the "Thistle Mechanical Milking Machine," which was first shown in 1895 and incorporated Shiels' patent rubber cups plus a mechanism which provided an intermittent rather than continuous suction, thus better replicating the natural sucking action of a calf. A company, The Thistle Mechanical Milking Machine Company Limited with Shiels and Elliot as partners was incorporated in 1895 to manufacture the machines with an initial capital of £50,000; some machines were sold, however they were noisy and difficult to keep clean. The company went into liquidation in 1898.

By 1901, Shiels was operating two profitable nursing homes, one in Glasgow and the other in the Regent's Park area of London, both catering to the wives of wealthy patients. George Grandison Millar later suggested the principles followed by Shiels were purely to make money at the expense of his patients, admitting them to his homes for several months and performing bogus or unnecessary cures or minor surgery.

In December 1902, Shiels married 22-year-old Georgina Clark at St Pancras Registry Office. Their daughter, Alexandrina, was born in October the following year, followed by a son, Alexander in 1904, and a daughter, Aileen, in 1907.

From around 1903, Shiels developed his interest in metallurgy. His patent "Improvements in or relating to the Annealing of Metals and Apparatus therefor" was filed in October that year. Another patent, applied for in June 1904, was for "Improvements in or relating to Time Indicating and Registering Apparatus, Workmen's Tell-tales and similar Appliances." and was put to commercial use for that purpose for a period, resulting in the short lived production of the "Kosmoid Time Recorder", a workmen's clocking-in clock.

== The "Kosmoid" saga ==
Shiels' growing interest in metallurgy and related engineering processes, seems, however to have engendered not only a large degree of self-promotion (not to say over-selling his plans to produce a vast range of products, almost all unrealised) (Note: Typical of Shiels' claims for his operations was the following: "manufacturer of Kosmoid's patented special non-synchronising spring axles, hollow lathe spindles, high-speed engines, petrol engines, dynamos, motors, motor omnibuses, motor launches, change-speed gear, steam condensers, steam separators, steam generators, oil colours, time recorders, locks, and spanners". Of these, the time recorders were actually produced, but the rest appear to have been either longer term plans, or simply figments of Shiels' imagination; in another claim he stated that the Kosmoids operated "engineering works, foundries, rolling mills and tube mills, copper smelters and refiners, makers of high conductivity brass bars, cumulator segments, copper strip, copper wire, copper sheets, copper cables, copper tubes, phosphor bronze, and cuferal metals". Only the Tube Works, described in typical style as "manufacturers of weldless hot and cold drawn tubes of iron, steel, copper brass, and cuferal metal; hollow shafting, hollow railway axles, &c" bore much relation to reality, and the several references to "cuferal" refer to a material that never existed.) but also, in addition to apparently legitimate concepts, a financially disastrous flirtation with the concept of alchemy, the claimed (but chemically impossible) transmutation of base metals into gold and other precious elements; in conjunction with this he believed that he had discovered a method to make a new (but non-existent) "super alloy" of iron and copper that he termed "cuferal", with which he hoped to revolutionalise the construction of metal structures throughout the world. To accomplish these aims he set up the Kosmoid group of metallurgical companies in 1904, acquired land at Dumbuck in the vicinity of Dumbarton, Scotland, raised a substantial amount of capital from local investors and set about constructing works that, according to his presentations to relevant local authority agencies, would involve the construction of some 6,000 homes for company workers and their families, covering the entire Dumbuck estate. The three companies that were set up to embody Shiels' schemes were Kosmoid Tubes Ltd., manufacturers of weldless steel tubes; Kosmoid Locks Ltd., set up as a result of an agreement between Shiels and John Smalley Campbell, an American physician and dentist then resident in London, who like Shiels was a sometime inventor on the side, with over 20 patents registered at the U.S. Patent office; and Kosmoid Ltd., the most secretive part of the operation, which was to operate two secret processes "known respectively as the Quicksilver Process and the Copper Process, by which quicksilver (i.e., mercury) could be produced from lead and copper from iron," and apparently to also make gold in limited quantities (as required for the Quicksilver Process) and, one presumes, the mysterious alloy "cuferal", utilising the services of one John Joseph Melville, a self-confessed alchemist who had a life-long career of controversial and scandalous business dealings.

== Later career ==
Two of Shiels' three Dumbuck companies, namely Kosmoid Locks Ltd. and the main company Kosmoid Ltd., were precipitated into subsequent liquidation when Shiels abruptly disappeared from his Scottish operations one day in September 1906; unknown to his fellow directors, he had found the financial pressures too great and fled to England, re-establishing himself not in London but in a substantial house ("Grangefield") in the small Northamptonshire village of Earls Barton. Harvie notes that he then set up as a consulting engineer, and collaborated with Frederic Russell and Alfred Jung of North London who specialised in developing patents for motor car engines, phonographs and medical equipment; Shiels continued to file a number of patents for novel developments in the area of internal combustion engines in particular up to his death. (After Shiels' death, Russell was later to revive the production of Kosmoid time recorders but under a new manufacturer name, "Rusmoid Limited, London" but citing Shiels' patent as its basis). However, Shiels' new operation was short lived: in the autumn of 1907, he suffered a severe stroke and collapsed on the platform of Willesden Station, location of Russell and Young's engineering operation, was transported home, and died at Earls Barton a few days later; for reasons that have not currently been established, he was buried in Rectory Lane Cemetery in Berkhamsted, Hertfordshire. His third Dumbuck company, Kosmoid Tubes Ltd., was the only one to survive him, being reconstituted after its dissolution as the Dumbarton Weldless Tube Company Ltd (interestingly, with Frederic Russell and Alfred Jung among its major shareholders), which was subsequently (in 1915) acquired by the American firm of Babcock & Wilcox who operated the facility on the same site until 1997.

== Legacy ==
Shiels is remembered chiefly for his audacious and bizarre plans for alchemy on an industrial scale via his "Kosmoid" operation, and for the extent that his investors were persuaded to part with considerable sums of money in support of the promised, but non existent returns. One investor, who did apparently recover some of his money, was George Grandison Millar, who under the pseudonym "Nathaniel P. McCoy" fictionalised the Kosmoid affair, plus giving copious commentary on what he perceives as Shiels' devious character (under the guise of "Dr Drexel") in a 1911 "novel" entitled "The Gold Makers", in which the actions of the Doctor are transplanted to the U.S.A. instead of Scotland.

Shiels died intestate and the value of his estate was £5,500. One residual structure from his planned "Kosmoid" metallurgical operation, the so-called "Fireproof Stores" in which Joseph Melville was to undertake his alchemical processes, was still standing in 1997, although it has subsequently been demolished; in that year David Harvie wrote of it: "Perhaps there is an argument for the listing of the "special concrete building of four floors" as being of unique architectural and historical interest. It is certainly unusual structurally, and there can be few equals in the country as the location of twentieth-century alchemy."

== Bibliography ==
- Dow, Derek A. 1986. "Alexander Shiels MB CM 1890, BSc 1891: a biographical note". pp. 34–35 in Harvie, 1986, q.v.
- Harvie, David I. 1986. "The Kosmoid enigma". Scottish Industrial History vol. 9.1-9.2, pp. 11–35 Available at https://web.archive.org/web/20241226053815/https://busarchscot.org.uk/wp-content/uploads/2021/02/Scottish-Industrial-history-Vol-9.1-and-9.2-1986-compressed.pdf (archived version)
- "Kosmoid Story" by Roger Kelly on kosmoid.net - includes text of David Harvie article, additional original commentary, and a photograph of Alexander Shiels (plus of other participants in the story)
- Nathaniel P. McCoy. 1911. "The Gold Makers". F.V. White, London. 311 pp. Available online at https://archive.org/details/cu31924013658251/mode/2up . (Note according to Harvie, ref. cited above, "Nathaniel P. McCoy" is in reality a pseudonym for George Grandison Millar).
- Private legislation (Scotland) procedure. Journal of proceedings upon applications to the secretary for Scotland for provisional orders under the Private legislation procedure (Scotland) act. 1899 1906 A-B, available at https://babel.hathitrust.org/cgi/pt?id=uiug.30112109842382, also https://www.google.com.au/books/edition/Private_Legislation_Scotland_Procedure/0uJHAQAAMAAJ
