= George Winthrop Fairchild =

American politician (1852-1924)

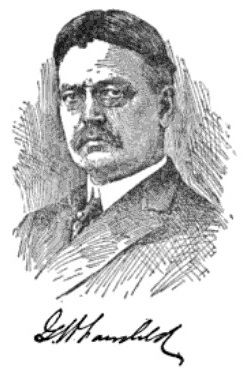

Member of the U.S. House of Representatives from New York
- In office March 4, 1907 – March 3, 1919
- Preceded by: Frank J. LeFevre
- Succeeded by: William H. Hill
- Constituency: 24th district (1907–13); 34th district (1913–19)

Personal details
- Born: May 6, 1854 Oneonta, New York, U.S.
- Died: December 31, 1924 (aged 70) New York City, U.S.
- Party: Republican
- Spouse: Josephine Mills Sherman
- Children: Sherman Mills Fairchild
- Parent(s): Jesse Fairchild; Belle Fairchild
- Occupation: Businessman

George Winthrop Fairchild (May 6, 1854 – December 31, 1924), was a six-term Republican U.S. representative from New York. Prior to joining congress, he was a businessman and investor, best known as the chairman of the Computing-Tabulating-Recording Company from 1915 to 1924, which later became IBM.

== Biography ==
He was born in Oneonta, New York, to Jesse and Belle Fairchild. His father was a poor farmer. George and his siblings had to help their father on the farm and had little opportunity to study. He attended the local school until he was 14 years old, when he apprenticed to a printer.

Primarily self-educated, he rose to prominence through his own effort and enterprise. In 1890, he became the sole proprietor of the Oneonta Herald, a weekly newspaper. He was a pioneer in the time recording industry. In 1896, in association with his friend Harlow N. Bundy, he joined the Bundy Manufacturing Company, a time clock manufacturer, as both an investor and director. In 1900 Fairchild formed the International Time Recording Company as the selling agency of the Bundy Manufacturing Company, Willard and Frick Manufacturing Company, and Standard Time Stamp Company, which also manufactured a card recorder.

In 1911, when the Computing-Tabulating-Recording Company was formed through the efforts of Charles R. Flint, Fairchild became president of the new company. He later became chairman of the company and continued in this role when, in February 1924, CTR was renamed as IBM. He was chairman of IBM until his death on December 31, 1924.

=== Congressional career ===
Apart from manufacturing and journalism, Fairchild was a seasoned politician. He was elected as a Republican to the Sixtieth and to the five succeeding Congresses (March 4, 1907 – March 3, 1919) while elected delegate to Republican National Convention from New York, 1912 and 1916.

Fairchild was elected vice president of the International Peace Conference. He was appointed by President Taft on August 10, 1910, as special commissioner to the First Centenary of Mexico at Mexico City, with the rank of Minister.

=== Marriage and family ===
He married Josephine Mills Sherman, daughter of William Sherman, of Davenport, Delaware County, New York, on March 18, 1891. They had a son, Sherman Mills Fairchild, who was born on April 7, 1896. His home in Oneonta, known as the Fairchild Mansion, was listed on the National Register of Historic Places in 1974.

U.S. House of Representatives
Preceded by Frank J. LeFevre	Member of the U.S. House of Representatives from New York's 24th congressional district 1907–1913	Succeeded by Woodson R. Oglesby
Preceded by James S. Simmons	Member of the U.S. House of Representatives from New York's 34th congressional district 1913–1919	Succeeded by William H. Hill
