= Kosmoid (metallurgical companies) =

Group of companies in Scotland, 1904–1906

Kosmoid was an early 20th-century group of Scottish metallurgical operations, represented by "Kosmoid Ltd." and two associated companies. It operated briefly (1904–1906), but was promoted as a potential major employer at Dumbuck, near Dumbarton, Scotland. The group collapsed following the abrupt departure of its founder, Dr. Alexander Shiels, in 1906. One subsidiary, Kosmoid Tubes Ltd., established a successful manufacturing operation on the Dumbuck site, which was subsequently acquired and operated by the firm Babcock & Wilcox until 1997. A small number of "Kosmoid Time Recorders" – workmen's clocking-in clocks – were manufactured in two versions, the second by a different company "Rusmoid" in the 1920s; both versions occasionally appear on the antiques market. The general story of Kosmoid's attempted manufacture of gold and other metals was later recounted in lightly fictionalised form in the 1911 novel The Gold Makers, written by an investor who had lost money in the venture.

== History ==
The Kosmoid Company portfolio, comprising Kosmoid Ltd., Kosmoid Locks Ltd., and Kosmoid Tubes Ltd., was founded by Dr. Alexander Shiels, a medical doctor and self-taught engineer and inventor based in Glasgow and London. By the end of 1903, Shiels had filed 26 patents covering a wide range of engineering interests, from automatic temperature regulation in closed rooms and improvements in pneumatic tyres to developments in automatic milking machines. In 1904, Shiels acquired the use of a 53-acre site on the Dumbuck estate near Dumbarton, Scotland, for his new "Kosmoid" projects. In its brief life, Kosmoid promised employment to around 6,000 workers, who were to be housed in a planned "garden suburb" on the slopes of Dumbuck Hill. The exact aims of the main company, Kosmoid Ltd., were never clearly defined. A prospectus cited in Private Legislation (Scotland) Procedure, 1906 described the work as follows:

The Kosmoids, Limited, as engineering works, foundries, rolling mills and tube mills, copper smelters and refiners, makers of high conductivity brass bars, accumulator segments, copper strip, copper wire, copper sheets, copper cables, copper tubes, phosphor bronze, and cuferal metals.

During negotiations over potential water supplies from Dumbarton, it was reported that Kosmoid had "taken over the whole of the Dumbuck estate" and intended to cover it with works and dwelling-houses. They also planned to construct 6,000 cottages within six or seven years, implying a population of at least 30,000 workers to be housed. It was estimated that Kosmoid would require one million gallons of water per day within two years and a further three million gallons once the works and population were fully established. At that time (May 1906), Kosmoid was understood to employ about 80 people.

At a later meeting with the Waterworks Committee the same month, according to a conversation with Dr Shiels, "On the low-lying part [of the Dumbuck estate] he spoke of a church, a school, and other such erections ... He spoke about terracing the slopes of Dumbuck [Hill] and building cottages all over the estate ... every man was to have his own house and his own garden."

== Kosmoid Locks Ltd. ==
Kosmoid Locks was registered in January 1904 following an agreement between Shiels and John Smalley Campbell, an American physician and dentist then resident in London. Campbell, like Shiels, was an occasional inventor, with over 20 patents registered at the U.S. Patent office, ranging from dentistry to locks. He is also credited with patenting the first horizontal drilling technique using a flexible shaft, originally developed for dentistry but later regarded as a precursor of modern oil and gas drilling methods. It is presumed that Kosmoid Locks Ltd. intended to manufacture locks based on Campbell's patents, but no further details of its operations appear to be available. Following the abrupt disappearance of Shiels in September 1906, Kosmoid Locks Ltd. was wound up by the summer of 1907.

== Kosmoid Tubes Ltd. ==
Kosmoid Tubes Ltd. was the only Kosmoid company to achieve lasting commercial success. Its tube works involved the construction of substantial plants and buildings that reportedly used novel machinery. It is said to be based on an American patent, which drew the tubes from solid ingots. The company's description in the Post-Office annual Glasgow directory, 1905-1906 reads: "manufacturers of weldless hot and cold drawn tubes of iron, steel, copper brass, and cuferal metal; hollow shafting, hollow railway axles, &c". After the departure of Shiels and the official winding up of the operation in 1910, its assets were purchased by the newly formed Dumbarton Weldless Tube Company Ltd., controlled by James Denny and Daniel Jackson, both initial shareholders in Kosmoid Tubes. The board also included representatives of the U.S.-headquartered engineering firm Babcock & Wilcox, which acquired full ownership of the works in 1915 and continued operation on the same site until its closure in 1997. The reference to "cuferal metal" is notable, as cuferal-- a proposed but ultimately non-existent "super alloy" of iron and copper--appears to have been central to Shiels' ambitions for the Dumbuck plant (see below).

== Kosmoid Ltd. ==
In many ways the most secretive of the three operations, the exact purpose of Kosmoid Ltd. was never spelled out except "to operate patents and licences", although Shiels was successful in attracting persons of some significance to both this company and to a (on paper) control group the "Metallurgical Syndicate"; according to Harvie, "the directors of the company were James Denny (the Dumbarton shipbuilder and engineer); Alexander Shiels; Charles W. Fulton, of the prosperous Paisley textile firm; George Grandison Millar, a wealthy art publisher; and, at various times, a number of influential ironmasters, engineers and merchants", while The Metallurgical Syndicate was a group of 18 persons, among them Alexander Shiels; G. G. Millar; Charles W. Fulton; Archibald Coats; William Donaldson; Archibald Denny; James Denny; Walter Brock; Peter Coats; and William Coats, with the stated aim of "the commercial development of the products of certain secret processes of manufacture known to Alexander Shiels, known respectively as the Quicksilver Process and the Copper Process, by which quicksilver (i.e., mercury) could be produced from lead and copper from iron." Having established this control group with an initial capital of £30,000 (equivalent to over £4.5 million in 2024), the members then yielded complete control to Shiels, in exchange for Shiels depositing a sealed packet, by arrangement, in the Syndicate's bank; this packet contained 'full information and instructions regarding the secret processes'. Meanwhile, again according to Harvie, "between 1903 and 1906 he [Shiels] had signed agreements and a deed of partnership with John Joseph Melville, a self-confessed alchemist who had a life-long career of controversial and scandalous business dealings. Shiels employed Melville and installed him in the Dumbarton factory, with complete freedom to operate according to their own agreements relating to 'the secret quicksilver process' and without interference from any of the Kosmoid directors."

== Operations on the site ==
From late 1904, Shiels embarked on a building program of facilities for some or all of these companies. According to Harvie:

The Glasgow architects firm of Dykes and Robertson were busy planning and erecting a number of large buildings on the Dumbuck site. The first building was a two-storey general engineering shop measuring 250 feet x 60 feet, followed by the tube mill, 250 feet x 150 feet; the electric power station, 300 feet x 45 feet and most impressive of all, the fireproof stores, four-storey, 210 feet x 45 feet; in addition, there was the gas plant, 150 feet x 120 feet and a small boiler house, 70 feet x 50 feet containing 4 boilers (28 more were ordered from Babcock & Wilcox Ltd). The various buildings on the site were linked together by about 8,000 feet of railway tracks, which also provided connection with the adjacent lines of the Caledonian and North British Railways. The fireproof stores building was constructed to specifications which suggest that it was designed to be much more than simply either stores or fireproof; the walls were of 2 feet thick concrete, clad in places with armoured steel plate; the floors were of concrete, supported by curved steel plate, further supported by reinforced steel beams of 18 inches x 7 inches section and 75 lbs/ft and in rows down the building every 10 feet there were cast-iron columns of 11 inches diameter and 2 inches thick iron. The fireproof stores, like the other buildings on the site, was owned by the Metallurgical Syndicate; this was the building which was later known – according to legend – as the Transmutation Building.

Some additional information on these buildings is given at a DSA Building Design Report at the former site for the Dictionary of Scottish Architects.

In 1906 the headquarters of the three companies, previously at 2 addresses in Glasgow, moved on site to Dumbuck House, but the same year, the "directors became more and more nervous in the face of public speculation and demands by Shiels for increased bank loans and overdrafts" In September 1906, Shiels disappeared. It subsequently transpired that he had moved to England to continue his work as a consulting engineer. However, by autumn 1907, he died suddenly after collapsing on the platform of Willesden Station; he was removed to his new home in Earl's Barton, Northamptonshire, where he died three days later. The companies did not survive his departure with both Kosmoid Ltd. and Kosmoid Locks being wound up by the summer of 1907, the Metallurgical Syndicate in 1908 and only Kosmoid Tubes being deemed worthy of rescue as described above.

Possibly independent of the three named companies as above, Shiels was involved in the manufacture of "time recorders" (workmen's time clocks, recording their entrance and exit to a workplace) from around 1904, apparently also under the Kosmoid brand, several hundred of which were sold to purchasers including the Dumbarton Burgh Police Authority. Manufacture may have been interrupted by legal challenges to the patent – which Shiels, in fact, won – although it was doubtless further compromised by Shiels' 1906 departure from Scotland and subsequent 1907 death. Manufacture of these, or similar items, appears to have been revived, still under the "Kosmoid" designation, by a separate company, "Rusmoid" of Dartmouth Street, London, in around 1920 (that company name presumably deriving in part from one of its directors, F.M. Russell) according to various patents, including patent 14747 issued June 30, 1904 for a signature recorder granted to Shiels. The actual circumstances of manufacture of the initial batch of time recorders is not currently known, although Shiels' success in finding local uptake suggests that they may have been produced at Dumbuck; the later versions manufactured by Rusmoid in London appear to have filled at least a small niche, and turn up intermittently in the world of collectables of modest value, thus keeping that incarnation of the "Kosmoid" name alive, if only as an antique.

Shiels' claim that Kosmoid was manufacturing petrol engines, among many other items, may not have been entirely groundless: the International Motor Exhibition 1906 Catalogue includes a demonstration of a "14-H.P. "Panther" Car, fitted with "Kosmoid" Engine" (on p. 159) in addition to the "Kosmoid" Time Recorders, on p. 187, described as "most useful and inexpensive time-checking instruments for garage use, and many other purposes."

Despite the absence of any official declarations of intent, a somewhat breathless article in London's Daily Express newspaper on 6 January 1906 exclaimed: "It is suggested that the real secret of Kosmoid was not the method of making Cuferal, but the transmutation of metals, and declared that such eminent men as Lords Kelvin, Overtoun and Inverclyde, having had ocular demonstration of the manufacture of gold, silver and copper from lead and iron, had become shareholders", notwithstanding that the involvement of those named was a complete fiction. However at least 2 other sources suggest that alchemical production of gold was not the main, or even a sensible goal: in particular there was no extensive industrial use for gold; appearance of new gold in unexplained quantities on the market without any obvious source would be bound to arouse suspicion; and the principal value of gold, being its rarity, would lead to a price collapse if produced in large, hitherto unseen quantity, leading to both foreseeable and unforeseeable knock-on effects for the economies of the developed world. Perhaps the various statements in "The Gold Makers", attributed to its lead character "Dr. Dexel" are closer to the truth, emanating as they do from one of Shiels' disgruntled investors who doubtless was persuaded to invest in the venture by Shiels himself (refer next section). In this novel, Dr Dexel states that, even though he can "make mercury from lead and transmute almost any metal", and would "form a small company for the purpose of making gold and silver", he would only "make as much gold as is necessary for the manufacture of copper, mercury and other metals." ...

"If we simply transmute baser metals into gold with the object of exploiting the human race for what we might consider our own benefit, nothing but disaster will be the result ... [However] our new metal, a mixture of copper and iron, is an alloy which will practically revolutionise bridge-building and shipbuilding, and will be used for a hundred other purposes in place of iron. It is infinitely stronger, practically untarnishable, and has many other qualities which neither iron nor copper have, so that it is the most valuable of all our discoveries as regards benefiting the human race."

It thus seems at least plausible that, in addition to planning to manufacture alchemical silver and gold in limited quantities, Shiels' principal aim as a money-making venture was the manufacture of his supposed copper-iron alloy, elsewhere termed Cuferal in his promotional dealings, with which he hoped to revolutionise the industrial world (and might also assist in understanding the rationale for setting up the Tube Works on the same site). Needless to say, such a product has never materialised in the 100+ years that have elapsed since Shiels' day (and with the inclusion of copper would be softer, not harder than pure iron), however alloys of iron that do not include copper, namely steel, an alloy of iron and carbon, and stainless steel (the same with added chromium, sometimes plus other elements) have indeed taken over from iron in the situations that he envisaged as suitable applications for his "Cuferal". Shiels' claims were evidently cited by the American stock adviser and dubious price manipulator Thomas W. Lawson in 1906, either as a reason for investors to sell copper-based shares (so that he could later benefit by re-purchasing these at a low price) or because he genuinely believed that the price of copper was about to be radically affected for the future, a suggestion which prompted a rather dismissive (but nonetheless interesting) commentary in the New York Times of 6 February, 1906. (Note: Of course, if as Shiels apparently believed, it were possible to manufacture copper from iron by transmutation (see above), as also reported the previous month in the Daily Express article cited above, Lawson's concerns about the future of the copper market might make much more sense, although the New York Times correspondent appears to have missed that point entirely and gone off following the trail of "Cuferal", without any success in relating it to the proposed manufacture of copper by a new process.)

Evidence that Shiels was intending to practice industrial scale alchemy in the twentieth century is contained in the goals of the Metallurgical Syndicate; in addition, he was promising to produce his new super-alloy "Cuferal" by a "secret process", he had a strange and highly over-specified building constructed as the "fireproof stores" for unnamed purposes, and he had entered into an agreement with Melville, a self confessed alchemist, to run the most crucial portion of the operation. The somewhat fanciful January 1906 Daily Express article also included the lines:

"A mysterious-looking document, apparently of American origin, reached the Express office for publication yesterday. It stated that the secret of the Philosopher's Stone and the transmutation of metals had been discovered by a young Glasgow doctor, and that certain buildings on the bank of the Clyde near Dumbarton will soon see the transmutation of the baser into the more valuable metals."

== Aftermath ==
It is not known whether the proposed alchemical nature of the main planned Kosmoid operations was an embarrassment to any of its directors or owners at the time; in parallel, during the early part of the twentieth century numerous discoveries were being made in the physical and chemical sciences including the discovery of X-Rays in the 1890s, the radioactive element Radium in 1898, and more; in addition, explanation of the structure and properties of elements according to atomic theory had not yet occurred, so the transmutation of metals might have seemed plausible, especially with the high demand for copper for use in cables due to the rapid uptake of electrification in the developed world. Nevertheless, viewed from a suitable distance in time, the proposal of industrial-scale alchemy in the twentieth century seems bizarre to more recent observers. One tangible resulting artifact was a 1911 book, ostensibly a novel but clearly a thinly disguised account of the affair at Kosmoid, entitled "The Gold Makers" by George Grandison Millar, former Kosmoid director and Metallurgical Syndicate member, writing under the pseudonym "Nathaniel P. McCoy"; in this work the location is transposed to Boston, U.S.A., however the essence of the plot appears to completely parallel the Kosmoid operation, so far as relevant facts are known, also covering earlier episodes in the Doctor's business activities including the operation of two separate nursing homes for wealthy clients (as was the case with Shiels), which the author has no hesitation as declaring to be bogus ventures for the sole purpose of making money. It seems that the ex-directors of Shiels' syndicate were none too happy with the public dissemination of the story, even in fictional form, Harvie (1986) stating: "It had further been claimed – and is yet to be disproved – that when his fellow directors learned of the publication of the novel, they bought up as many copies as possible and had them destroyed; certainly copies of the novel are rare."

Whether Shiels was to some (or even a large) extent a successful confidence trickster, or whether he really believed that he had discovered the secret(s) of transmutation of metals and was thereby about to make not only his own fortune but that of his investors, may perhaps never be known. Nonetheless, G.G. Millar, writing after Shiels' death, appears to have been of the former mind, in his 1911 book making the following observations about the "Shiels" character (designated therein both as "Dr. Dexel" and "Professor Dexel"):

The confessions of the doctor's confederates, showed that he was really a most extraordinary man – a man without conscience, and with an infinite capacity for trickstering and insincerity. ... Whether he believed originally that he could transmute metals, or that his many patents were as valuable as he said they were, must ever remain a mystery. Possibly he had deceived himself, and having gone too far to retreat was forced to go on. A partial explanation may be found in admitting that his mind was some extent unhinged ... Even if we admit lunacy in some form, we cannot forgive the absolute cold-hearted villainy of this scoundrel.

Meanwhile, David Harvie's (1986) assessment is somewhat different:

The legend has had Shiels fleeing all over the world, pursued by his business enemies; existing in poverty selling patent medicines and, after death, being exhumed and secretly reburied. The truth is rather more ordinary, and even the suggestions of huge fraud are groundless. He certainly did not 'run off with the money' – he died intestate, and the value of his estate was only £5,500. Certainly a great deal of money was lost by investors. The popular version of this affair often suggests that the whole thing was a great fraud perpetuated by Shiels and supported by his backers. This is certainly not the case, although it has to be wondered what persuaded such eminent figures to invest in what so quickly was seen as a foolish venture.

In 1997, David Harvie also wrote: "Perhaps there is an argument for the listing of the "special concrete building of four floors" as being of unique architectural and historical interest. It is certainly unusual structurally, and there can be few equals in the country as the location of twentieth-century alchemy." Unfortunately for this proposition, the building was demolished in 2008.

Postscript: earlier in "The Gold Makers", the "secret packet" of explanation for the quicksilver process by which quicksilver is transmuted into gold, the content of which had been told to the directors as worth a million pounds, is opened in their presence after the disappearance of the doctor, and found to contain nothing but a double sheet of blank paper.

== Bibliography ==
- Harvie, David I. 1986. The Kosmoid enigma. Scottish Industrial History vol. 9.1-9.2, pp. 11–35 Available at https://web.archive.org/web/20241226053815/https://busarchscot.org.uk/wp-content/uploads/2021/02/Scottish-Industrial-history-Vol-9.1-and-9.2-1986-compressed.pdf (archived version)
- "Kosmoid Story" by Roger Kelly on kosmoid.net - includes text of David Harvie article, additional original commentary, and a photograph of Alexander Shiels (plus of other participants in the story)
- Nathaniel P. McCoy. 1911. The Gold Makers. F.V. White, London. 311 pp. Available online at https://archive.org/details/cu31924013658251/mode/2up . (Note according to Harvie, ref. cited above, "Nathaniel P. McCoy" is in reality a pseudonym for George Grandison Millar).
- Private legislation (Scotland) procedure. Journal of proceedings upon applications to the secretary for Scotland for provisional orders under the Private legislation procedure (Scotland) act. 1899 1906 A-B, available at https://babel.hathitrust.org/cgi/pt?id=uiug.30112109842382, also https://www.google.com.au/books/edition/Private_Legislation_Scotland_Procedure/0uJHAQAAMAAJ
