= SimplexGrinnell =

American fire protection company

SimplexGrinnell LP
- Company type: Subsidiary
- Industry: Fire suppression systems; Fire detection and notification systems; Communications and security systems
- Founded: 1892 (Grinnell); 1894 (Simplex); 2001 (as SimplexGrinnell)
- Headquarters: Boca Raton, Florida, U.S.
- Parent: Tyco International (1970–2016); Johnson Controls (since 2016)
- Website: www.tycosimplexgrinnell.com

SimplexGrinnell, a subsidiary of Johnson Controls, is an American company specializing in active fire protection systems, communication systems and testing, inspection and maintenance services. The company headquarters is in Boca Raton, Florida; corporate sales and marketing offices are in Westminster, Massachusetts, and the company has about 160 district offices throughout North America. It is currently the largest fire protection company in the world.

Grinnell Fire Protection was purchased by Tyco in 1976. Tyco bought Simplex Time Recorder Company on January 5, 2001, for US$1.15 billion and merged it with Grinnell Fire Protection, forming SimplexGrinnell. The time clock division of Simplex was sold to Kronos shortly afterward. On September 6, 2016, Johnson Controls and Tyco completed a merger. In May 2017, Johnson Controls announced that the brand identity of SimplexGrinnell will be transitioned to Johnson Controls. SimplexGrinnell's fire sprinkler services will become Grinnell Fire Protection Solutions, a separate brand under Johnson Controls. Johnson Controls will continue to sell Simplex fire and security products under the Simplex brand name.

== Corporate history ==
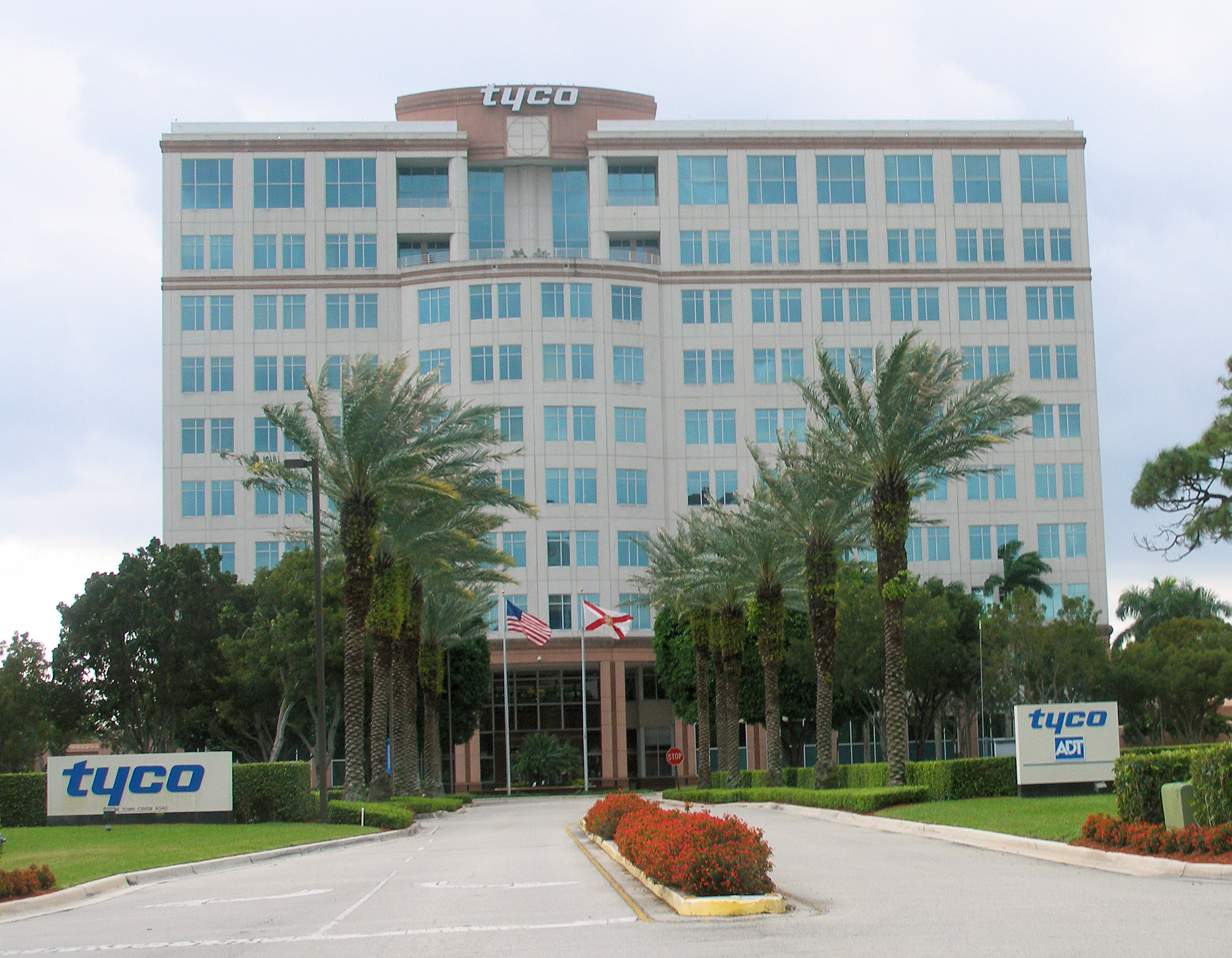
Tyco Fire & Security headquarters in Boca Raton (also home to SimplexGrinnell)

=== Grinnell Fire Protection Company ===
Frederick Grinnell, an 1855 graduate of Rensselaer Institute (now Rensselaer Polytechnic Institute), worked in railroad engineering until he retired as chief mechanical engineer and general manager of the Jersey City Locomotive Works. Soon after his retirement, he purchased a controlling interest in the Providence Steam and Gas Pipe Company.

Grinnell already knew Henry S. Parmalee, who patented the first automatic fire sprinkler head in 1874. Providence Steam & Gas partnered with Parmalee and manufactured the Parmalee sprinkler; Grinnell also designed and erected the piping installations into which the Parmalee sprinkler heads were fitted. Grinnell improved Parmalee's first practical automatic sprinkler and patented his own Grinnell sprinkler in 1882. Continual improvements resulted in the glass disc sprinkler in 1890. With slight modifications, this sprinkler head is still used in modern fire sprinkler systems; sprinklers are even called le Grinnells in France. In 1892, Grinnell organized the General Fire Extinguisher Company, which was renamed the Grinnell Fire Protection Company after his death in 1919. The main manufacturing facility was in North Carolina at the Grinnell Company-General Fire Extinguisher Company Complex.

=== Simplex Time Recorder Company ===
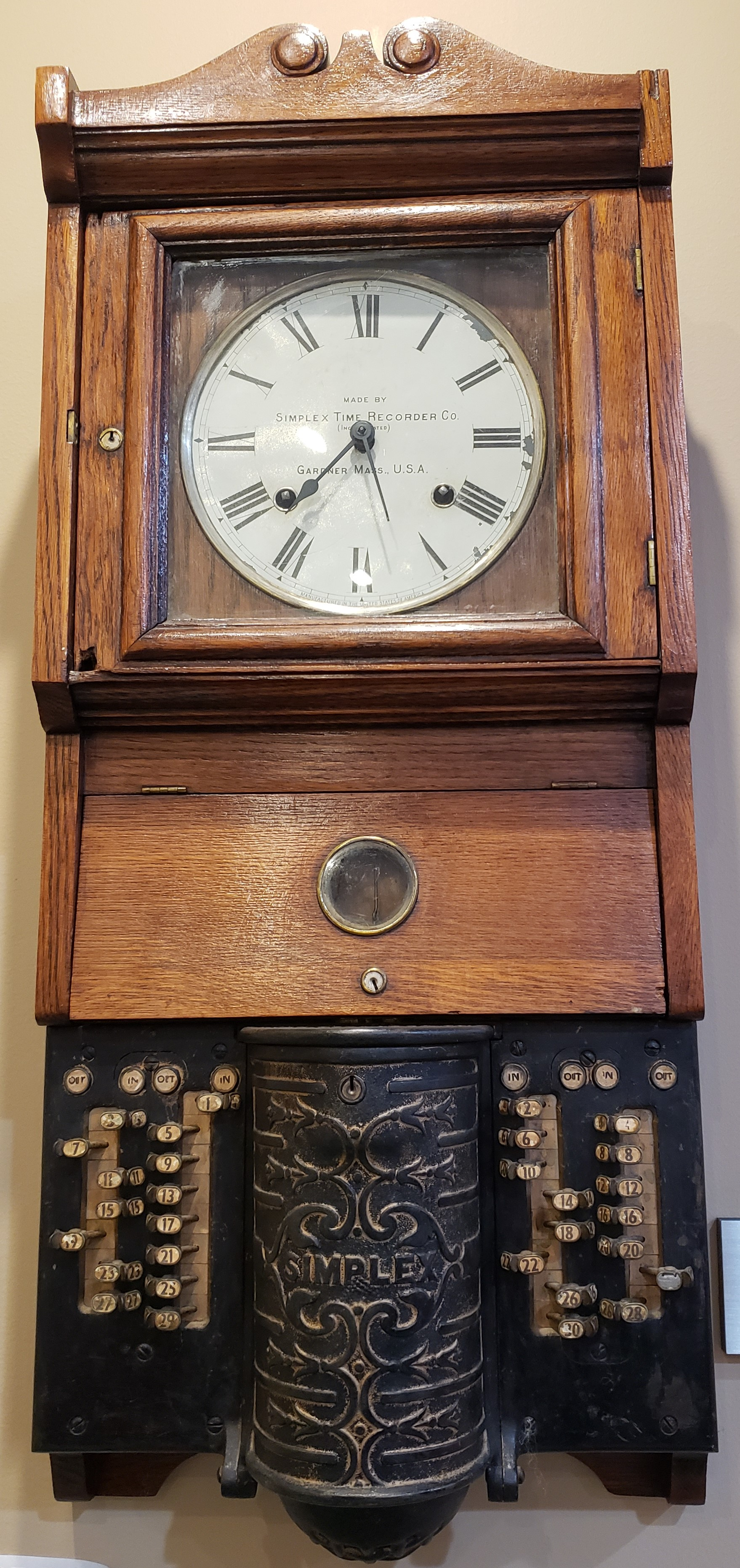
Simplex Time Recording Company

Meanwhile, Edward G. Watkins founded the Simplex Time Recorder Company in 1894. Watkins invented and patented one of the first practical time clocks, along with the synchronized clock systems seen in schools up until recent times. The company, located in Gardner, Massachusetts, purchased the IBM Time Equipment Division in 1958. This purchase included IBM's fire protection division. Originally, Simplex's fire alarm line simply consisted of relabeled IBM devices and control panels, but they began to introduce redesigned IBM products starting in the early 1960s. In the mid-1960s, Simplex attempted to introduce low-voltage DC systems; these panels were not a success. Most of Simplex's audible notification appliances prior to the 1990s were relabeled Benjamin Electric, Federal Signal, Faraday, and Autocall devices. Simplex's time-division began to lose market share, but their newly founded fire alarm division significantly prospered. In 1970, Simplex introduced conventional control panels.

In 1979, Simplex introduced the industry's first networked multiplex building control system that was capable of handling fire alarm, security, HVAC, synchronized time, and watchman's tour.

=== Other products ===
SimplexGrinnell also markets burglar alarms, PA systems, and nurse call systems. They also provide testing, inspection, and maintenance services for fire alarm, sprinkler, suppression, security, and communication equipment. To a much lesser degree, the company also sells and services pull stations, time clocks, and master time systems and Mass Notification systems.

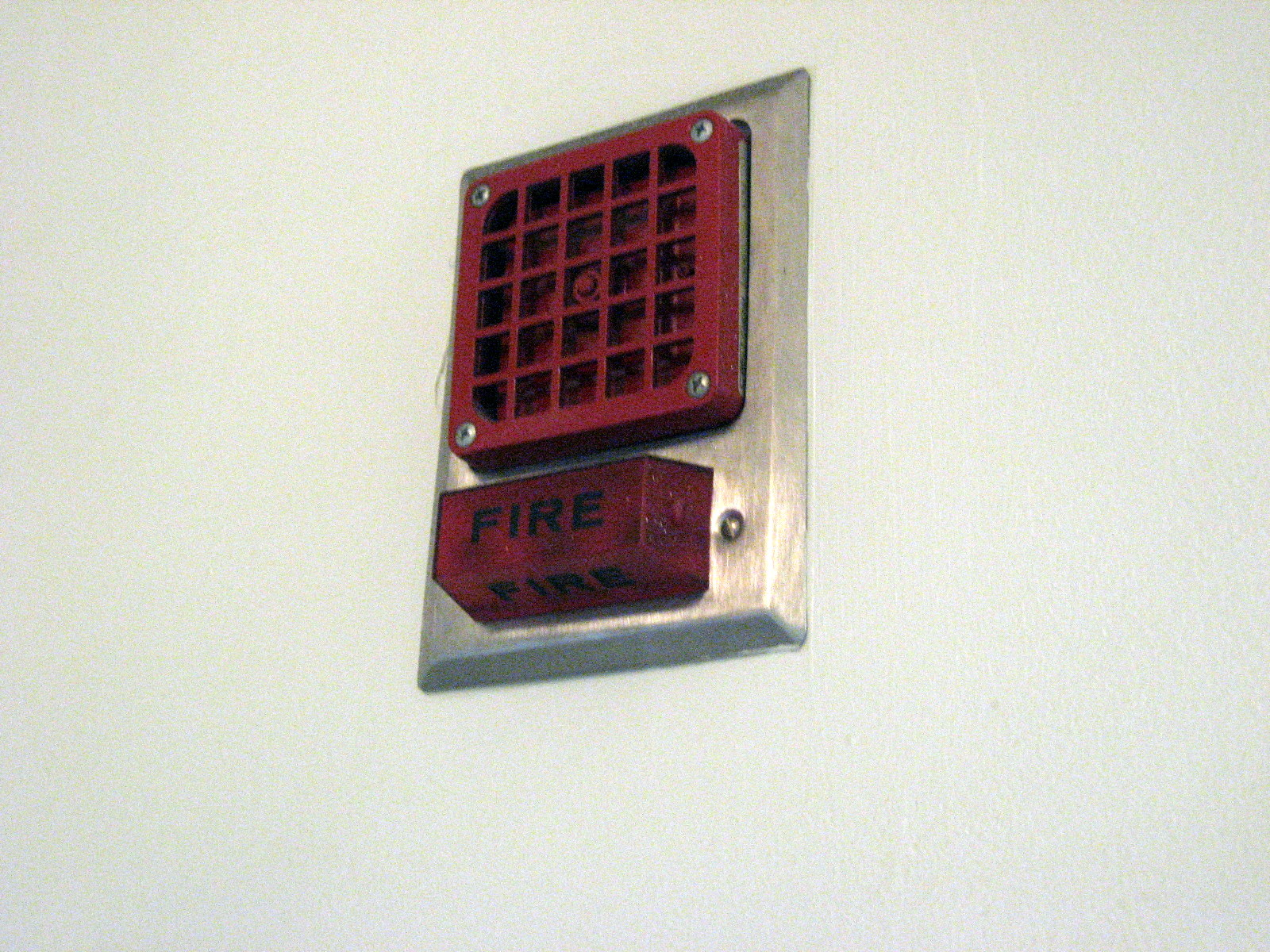
Older 4051+4050-80 fire alarm

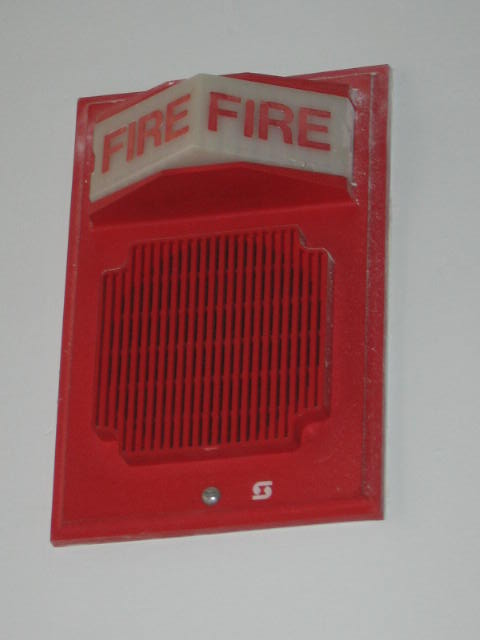
Simplex 2902-9739 LifeAlarm fire alarm

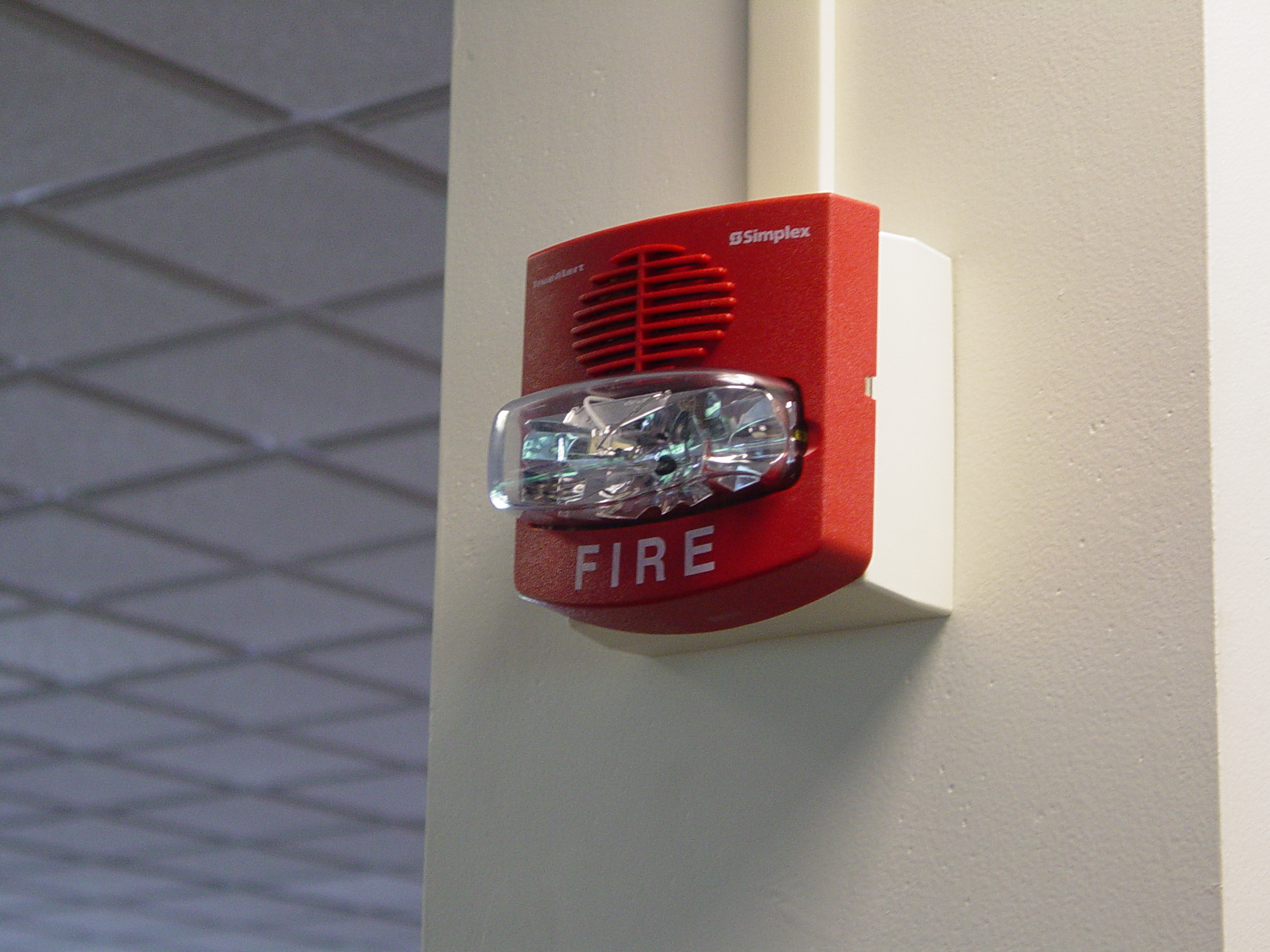
Simplex TrueAlert fire alarm

Simplex 2120 (left) next to a 4100

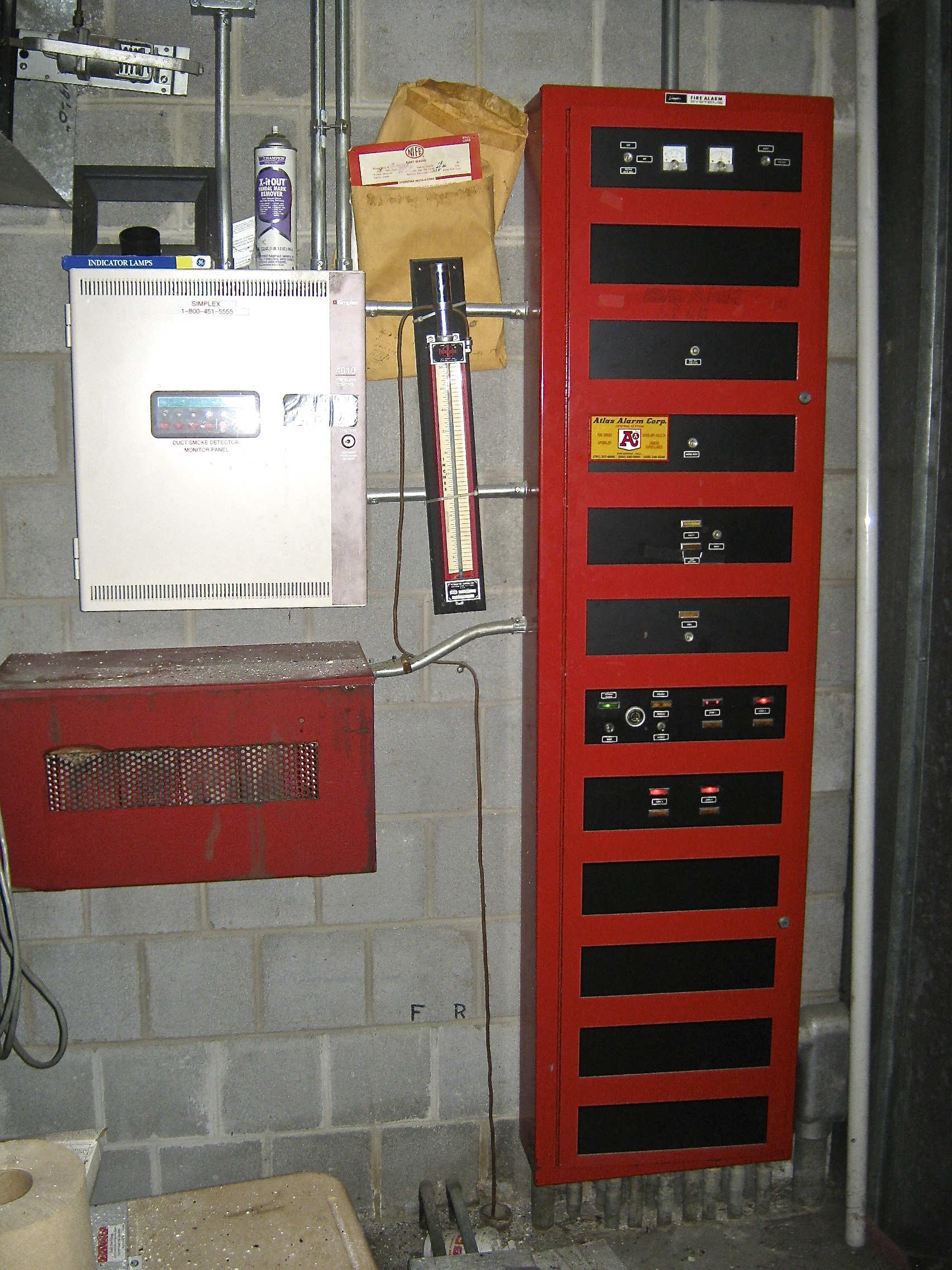
A Simplex 4010 addressable fire alarm panel tied into an older Simplex 4208 conventional fire alarm panel

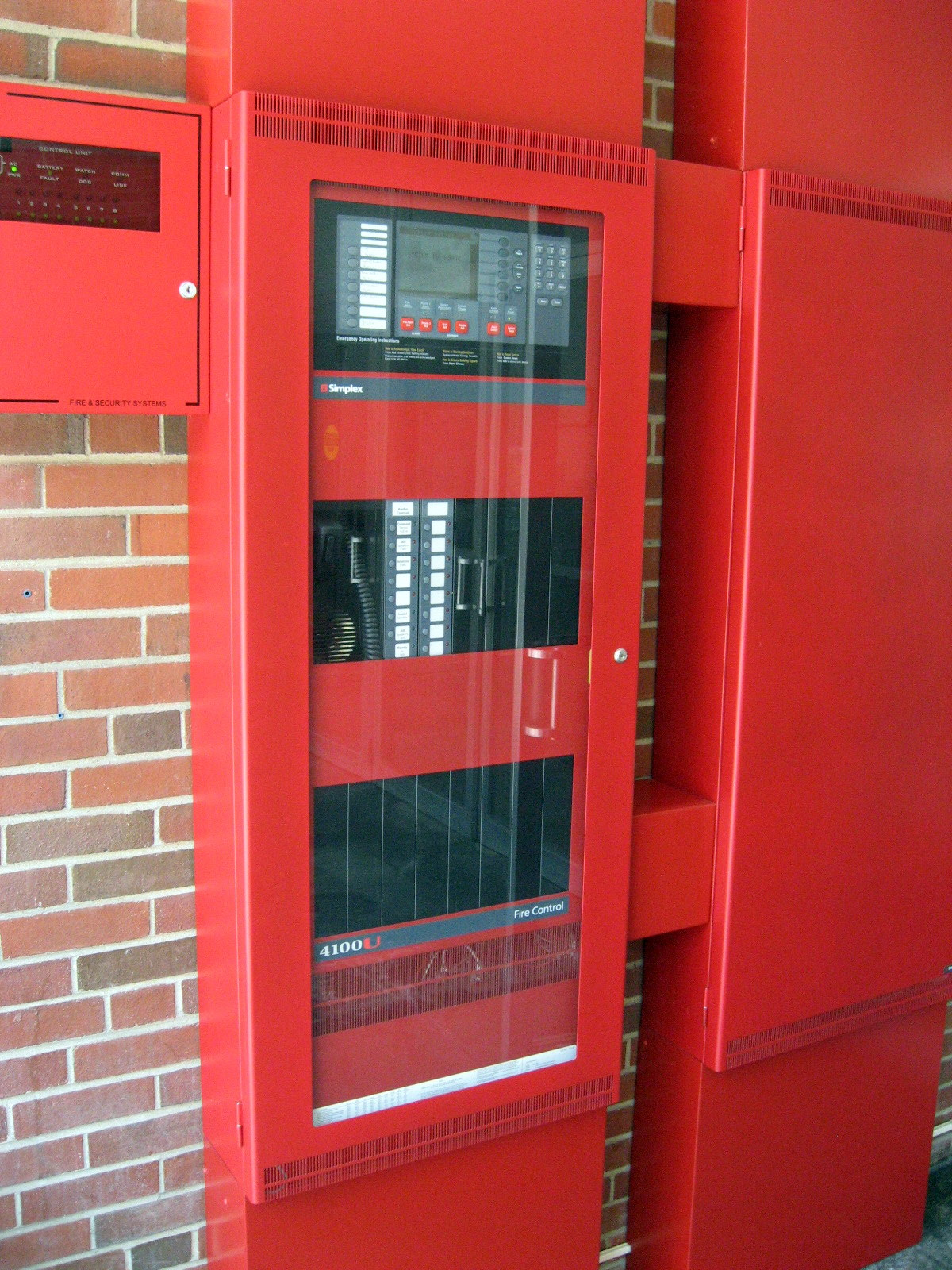
More modern Simplex 4100U panel

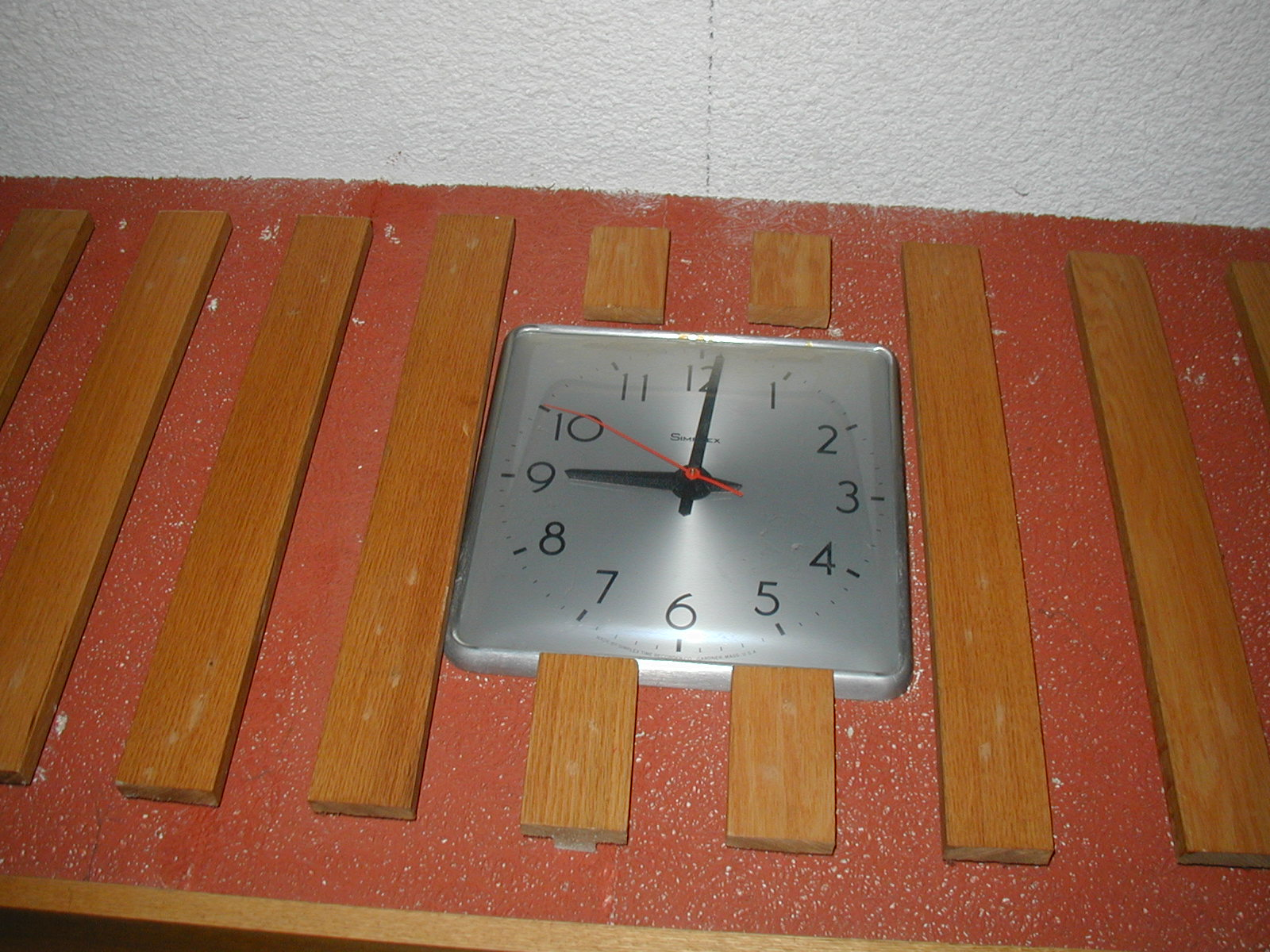
Older Simplex slave clock.

== See also ==
- ADT
- Bundy Manufacturing Company
