= Autocall =

American manufacturer of emergency communications equipment

- Type: Company
- Industry: Fire detection and notification systems Communications
- Founded: 1908
- Fate: Acquired by Wormald International
- Headquarters: Shelby, Ohio
- Parent: Johnson Controls

Autocall is a company that specializes in fire protection and customized communications equipment. The original company was founded in 1908 and was based in Shelby, Ohio. The Autocall brand became defunct in 2001 after it was incorporated into the SimplexGrinnell merger by Tyco International. On September 6, 2016, Johnson Controls and Tyco completed a merger, and Johnson Controls relaunched the Autocall brand in late 2017.

== Early history ==
Autocall was founded in 1908 by two businessmen from Shelby Electric Company after they witnessed a demonstration of a unique telegraph system in use at a plant for employee communication while on a business trip. Seeing the need for such a system at their own company, the two designed an automatic version of this system and founded Autocall. Soon after, the company produced their first 120VAC coded fire alarm system. In 1920, an advertisement centered on the infamous Triangle Shirtwaist Factory Fire helped to gain the company significant business and began to establish them as a serious competitor in the industry. In 1922, the company created an automatic punch recorder designed to record system status changes by punching holes in ticker tape. In 1933, Autocall purchased the Howe Manufacturing Company of Chicago, Illinois and used their proprietary transmitter design to produce the Autocall-Howe system, a high-end fire alarm system targeted at large institutions and industrial plants. By the 1960s, Autocall-Howe systems were installed in many of the United States' largest factories, airports, and universities.

== Innovations ==
(Top) Autocall Auto Monitor system, (Bottom) Auto Command network control center from 1978

Starting in the mid-1960s, Autocall began transitioning all of their fire alarm systems to solid state technology. In 1970, the company produced the NA series of fire alarm systems which utilized modular components driven by printed circuit boards instead of traditional hardwired relays. In 1973, Autocall invented the first voice evacuation system, followed by a firefighter's communication system in 1974. These technologies were OEM distributed to numerous other fire alarm companies who did not yet produce their own. In 1977, Autocall introduced Auto Monitor, an entirely solid-state multiplex system that utilized remote transponders to distribute IDC's and other connections. These transponders could handle up to 8 points and remained in production for several years thereafter. A year later, the company introduced the Auto Command, a remote microprocessor-controlled command center with built-in printer.

The Auto Monitor interpreted network command centers as transponders on the multiplex loop. Shortly thereafter, the company introduced custom designed rackmount systems which had to be factory programmed for each client. Due to the rapidly growing clientele and increased complexity of programs, Autocall brought field programmability to its multiplex systems in the mid-1980s. In 1987, Autocall introduced a smaller series of one-loop field-programmable addressable systems for a burgeoning market of mid-size addressable applications. In 1989, Autocall introduced the first color touchscreen graphic annunciator, known as Autograph. In 1990, the company replaced the aging Auto Command II system with the AL-1500, a modern system capable of over 4,000 points.

== Demise ==
In 1990, the company was bought by Wormald International which then sold the company to Thorn Security. Under the name "Thorn/Autocall", the company produced the TFX-series addressable panels and C-series conventional panels, which were rebrands of the Silent Knight SK-series conventional panels of the time.

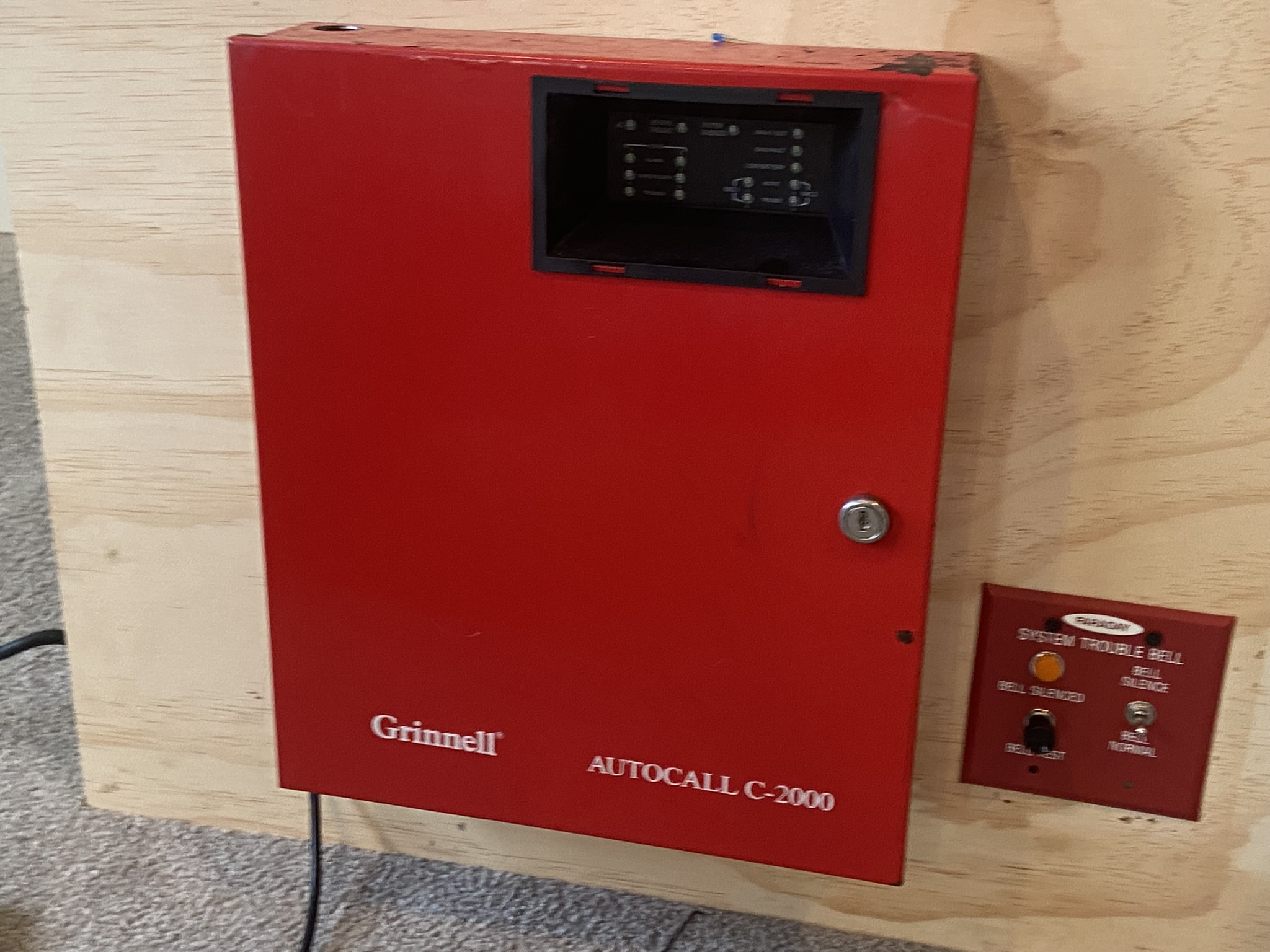
An Autocall C-2000 panel. This panel was the 2 zone variant of the C-series conventional fire alarm panels released by Autocall in the late 1990s.

When Thorn was purchased by Tyco-owned Grinnell in 1996, their systems were branded under "Grinnell/Autocall". In 2001, Tyco purchased Simplex Time Recorder Company and merged it with Grinnell, forming SimplexGrinnell.

== Relaunch ==
Tyco retained the Autocall trademark, but the brand name went unused until Tyco merged with Johnson Controls on September 6, 2016. In 2017, Johnson Controls relaunched Autocall as a subsidiary brand. Autocall markets a complete line of Simplex manufactured fire protection products to independent dealers. Autocall, along with Simplex, offers addressable notification appliances known as TrueAlert ES. These notification appliances are capable of reducing wiring, undergoing "self testing", strobe candela choice from the FACP, and make it easy to add new signals. This line includes the regular horn/strobes, multi tone horn/strobes capable of outputting a 520 Hz Low Frequency tone for sleeping areas, outdoor signals, speaker/strobes, and LED devices.
