= Kate Simmons =

American composer

Emma Kate Simmons Flint (March 3, 1850 - March 8, 1926) was an American composer and philanthropist who is best known for her piano piece Racquet Galop, which sold over 100,000 copies. She published her music under the name Kate Simmons or E. Kate Simmons.

Simmons was born in Troy, New York, to Mary Sophia Gleason and Joseph Ferris Simmons, a banker. She married the successful businessman Charles Ranlett Flint in 1883 and they lived in Manhattan.

Little is known about Simmons’ education. She donated the money she made from her musical compositions to charity, endowing a bed at St. Luke's Hospital with the proceeds from Racquet Galop.

Simmons’ music was published in America and internationally by Augener & Co., Carl Fischer Music, Charles Sheard & Co., Edwin Ashdown Ltd., Hachette & Co., and Oliver Ditson & Co. Racquet Galop was arranged for various instruments by Winslow Lewis Hayden and L. Winner, among others. Her compositions included:

== Piano ==
- Berceuse (Cradle Song)
- El Fresco Waltz
- From East to West Waltz
- Gigue Fantastique
- Invincible Galop
- Lawn Tennis Galop
- Poste
- Racquet Galop
- Racquet Polka
- Racquet Quickstep
- Royal Fanfare Galop

== Voice ==
- "Good Bye" (text by F. W. Green; arranged by Alfred Lee)
- Download sheet music for Racquet Galop by E. Kate Simmons
