= Computing-Tabulating-Recording Company =

Former American business machines company

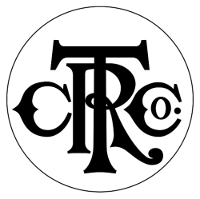
- Industry: Business machines
- Predecessor: Bundy Manufacturing Company; International Time Recording Company; Tabulating Machine Company; Computing Scale Company of America
- Founded: June 16, 1911; 115 years ago
- Founders: George Winthrop Fairchild; Charles Ranlett Flint; Herman Hollerith
- Fate: Renamed International Business Machines (IBM) in 1924
- Key people: George W. Fairchild (Chairman); Thomas J. Watson Sr. (President; 1915–1924)

The Computing-Tabulating-Recording Company (CTR) was a holding company of manufacturers of record-keeping and measuring systems. The company would ultimately become known as IBM.

In 1911, the financier and noted trust organizer Charles R. Flint, called the "Father of Trusts", amalgamated (via stock acquisition) four companies: Bundy Manufacturing Company, International Time Recording Company, the Tabulating Machine Company, and the Computing Scale Company of America; creating a fifth company – the Computing-Tabulating-Recording Company.

CTR was initially located in Endicott, New York. The amalgamated companies had 1,300 employees and manufactured a wide range of products, including employee time-keeping systems, weighing scales, automatic meat slicers, and punched card equipment.

CTR was renamed the International Business Machines Corporation (IBM) in 1924.

The individual companies continued to operate using their established names until the businesses were integrated in 1933, and the holding company was eliminated.

== Companies amalgamated ==
=== Bundy Manufacturing Company ===
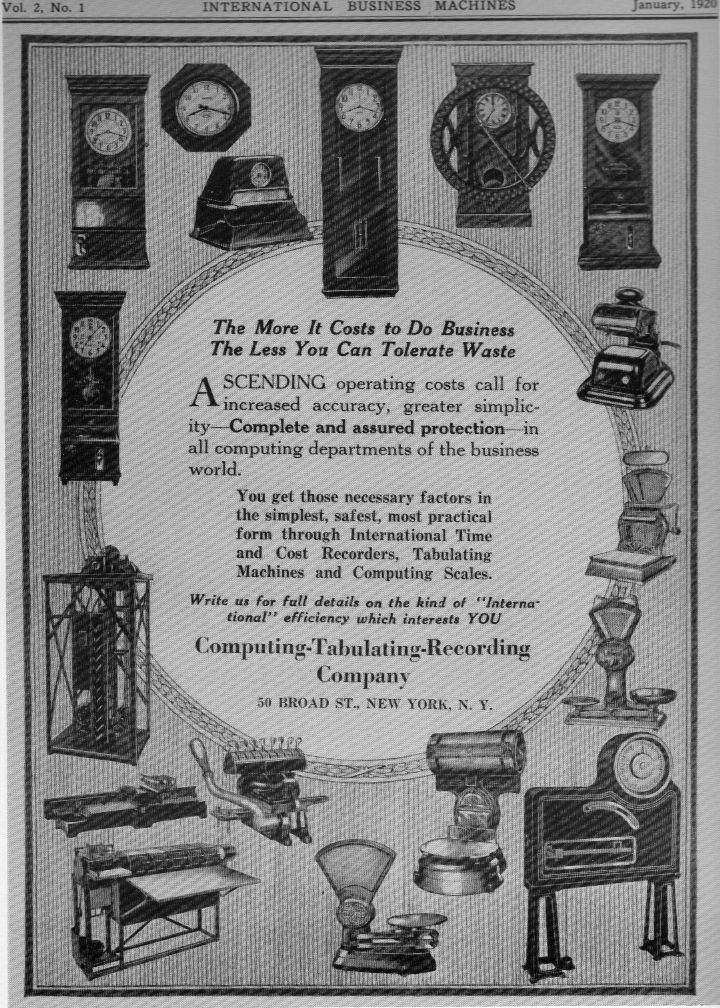
Front cover of a January 1920 sales catalog showing clocks, scales and tabulating equipment)

The first time clock was invented on November 20, 1888, by Willard Bundy, a jeweler in Auburn, New York. A year later, his brother, Harlow Bundy, organized the Bundy Manufacturing Company, and began mass-producing time clocks.

In 1900, Bundy Manufacturing sold its time recording business to a new company, the International Time Recording Company. Bundy Manufacturing went on to produce adding machines.

In 1906 Harlow Bundy moved his business into a new three-story brick building in Endicott, New York.

=== International Time Recording Company ===
In 1894, J. L. Willard and F. A. Frick of Rochester, New York, formed the Willard & Frick Manufacturing Company as the first time card recorder company in the world.

In 1900 George W. Fairchild, an investor and director of the Bundy Manufacturing Company, led the formation in Jersey City, New Jersey, of the International Time Recording Company (ITR) which consolidated the time recording business of Bundy with the Willard & Frick Manufacturing Co. In 1901, the company was re-incorporated in Binghamton, New York. The same year, it acquired the Chicago Time-Register Co., the first autograph time recorder company in the world and a manufacturer of key, card, and autograph employee time recorders.

In 1906, ITR relocated to Endicott, New York, where it built a larger factory next to the new building of the Bundy Manufacturing Company. Before the CTR amalgamation, Harlow Bundy would be named ITR's treasurer and general manager.

Dr. Alexander Dey invented the first dial recorder in 1888, and in 1907 ITR acquired the Del Ray Register Company. In 1908, ITR acquired the Syracuse Time Recorder Company, a manufacturer of dial recorders.

ITR's 1935 catalog lists various clocks, from industrial timeclocks, recording clocks, and program clocks to ornamental store-front clocks. It also lists the Series 970 Intercommunicating Telephone System. Since 1907 or earlier ITR had published a magazine, Time, for employees and customers; in 1935 IBM renamed the magazine Think.

=== Tabulating Machine Company ===
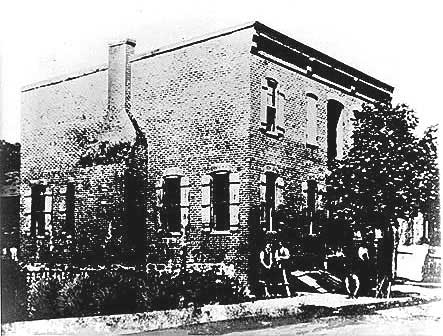
Hollerith's plant in 1893

Herman Hollerith initially did business under his own name, as The Hollerith Electric Tabulating System, specializing in punched card data processing equipment. In 1896 he incorporated as the Tabulating Machine Company and in 1905 reincorporated as The Tabulating Machine Company. Hollerith's series of patents on tabulating machine technology, first applied for in 1884, drew on his work at the U.S. Census Bureau from 1879 to 1882. Hollerith initially tried to reduce the time and complexity needed to tabulate the 1890 Census. His development of punched cards in 1886 set the industry standard for the next 80 years of tabulating and computing data input.

In 1896 the Tabulating Machine Company leased some machines to a railway company but quickly focused on the challenges of the largest statistical endeavor of its day – the 1900 US Census. After winning the government contract and completing the project, Hollerith faced the challenge of sustaining the company in non-Census years. He returned to targeting private businesses in the United States and abroad, attempting to identify industry applications for his semiautomatic punching, tabulating, and sorting machines. Flint bought the business for $2.3 million (of which Hollerith got $1.2 million) in 1911.

=== Computing Scale Company of America ===
The Computing Scale Company of America was a holding company, organized in 1901 and amalgamating as subsidiary companies The Computing Scale Company, Dayton, Ohio; The Moneyweight Scale Company, Chicago, Illinois; The W.F. Simpson Company of Detroit, Michigan; and The Stimpson Computing Scale Company of Elkhart, Indiana. In 1891, Edward Canby and Orange O. Ozias, two businessmen from Dayton, Ohio, purchased the patents for the newly invented computing scale and incorporated the Computing Scale Company to produce commercial scales.

== Amalgamation ==
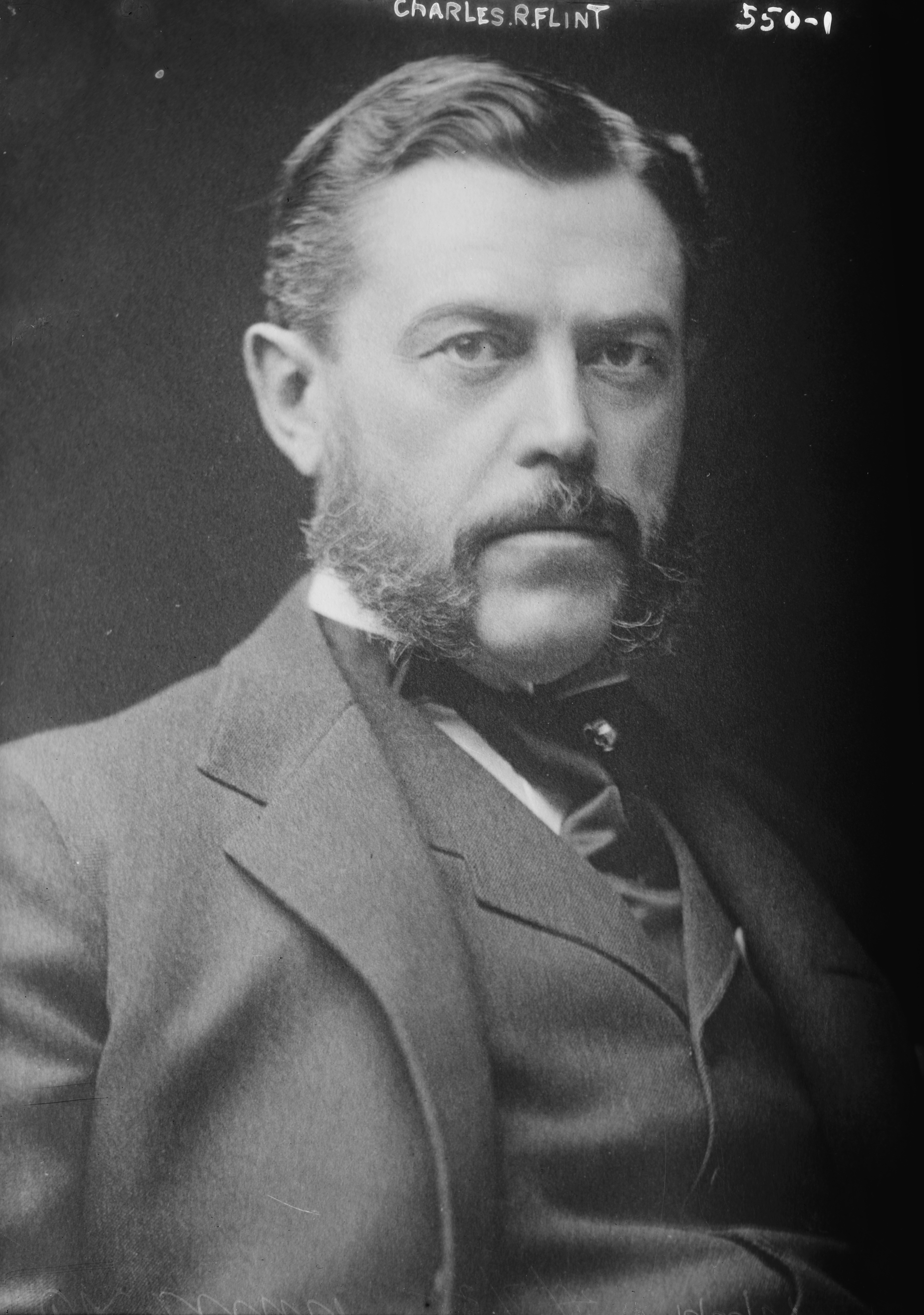
Charles Ranlett Flint had already created several successful consolidations, including creating industrial giant U.S. Rubber.

Flint amalgamated the four companies into the new CTR holding company. CTR had a bonded indebtedness of $6.5 million, three times its current assets, of which the Guaranty Trust Company had loaned $4 million. Flint assigned it a value of $17.5 million, while its tangible assets only added up to $1 million. Flint stated that the various manufacturers produced similar but not identical products and that the

..."allied consolidation", instead of being dependent for earnings upon a single industry, would own three separate and distinct lines of business so that in normal times the interest and sinking funds on its bonds could be earned by any one of these independent lines, while in abnormal times the consolidation would have three chances instead of one to meet its obligations and pay dividends.

CTR's 1911 stock prospectus reported net earnings, from May 1, 1910, to April 30, 1911, of $950,000 for the four companies.

== Organization and leadership ==
CTR and the four amalgamated companies had 1,300 employees, with offices and plants in Endicott and Binghamton, New York; Dayton, Ohio; Detroit, Michigan; Washington, D.C.; and Toronto, Ontario. CTR was located in Endicott. The chairman was George Winthrop Fairchild, who, having been a member of Congress since 1906, was not expected to take an active part in management. When the first president left after just one month, however, Fairchild took over and ran CTR until 1912, when Frank N. Kandolf, formerly CEO of the International Time Recording subsidiary, took over. Flint was a member of the board of CTR (and later IBM) until his retirement in 1930. Herman Hollerith served as a consulting engineer until he retired in 1921.

=== Early Watson era ===
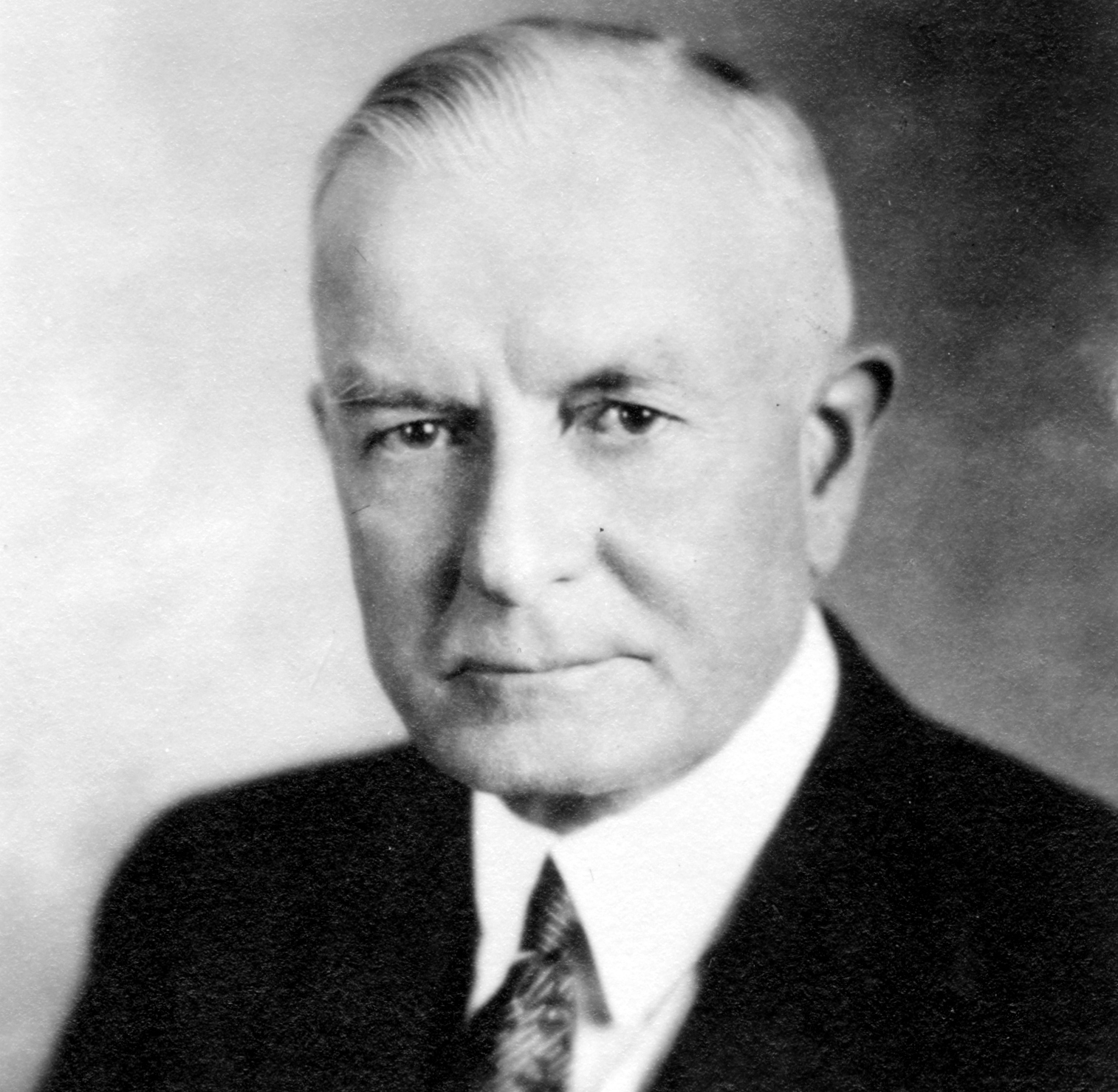
Thomas J. Watson

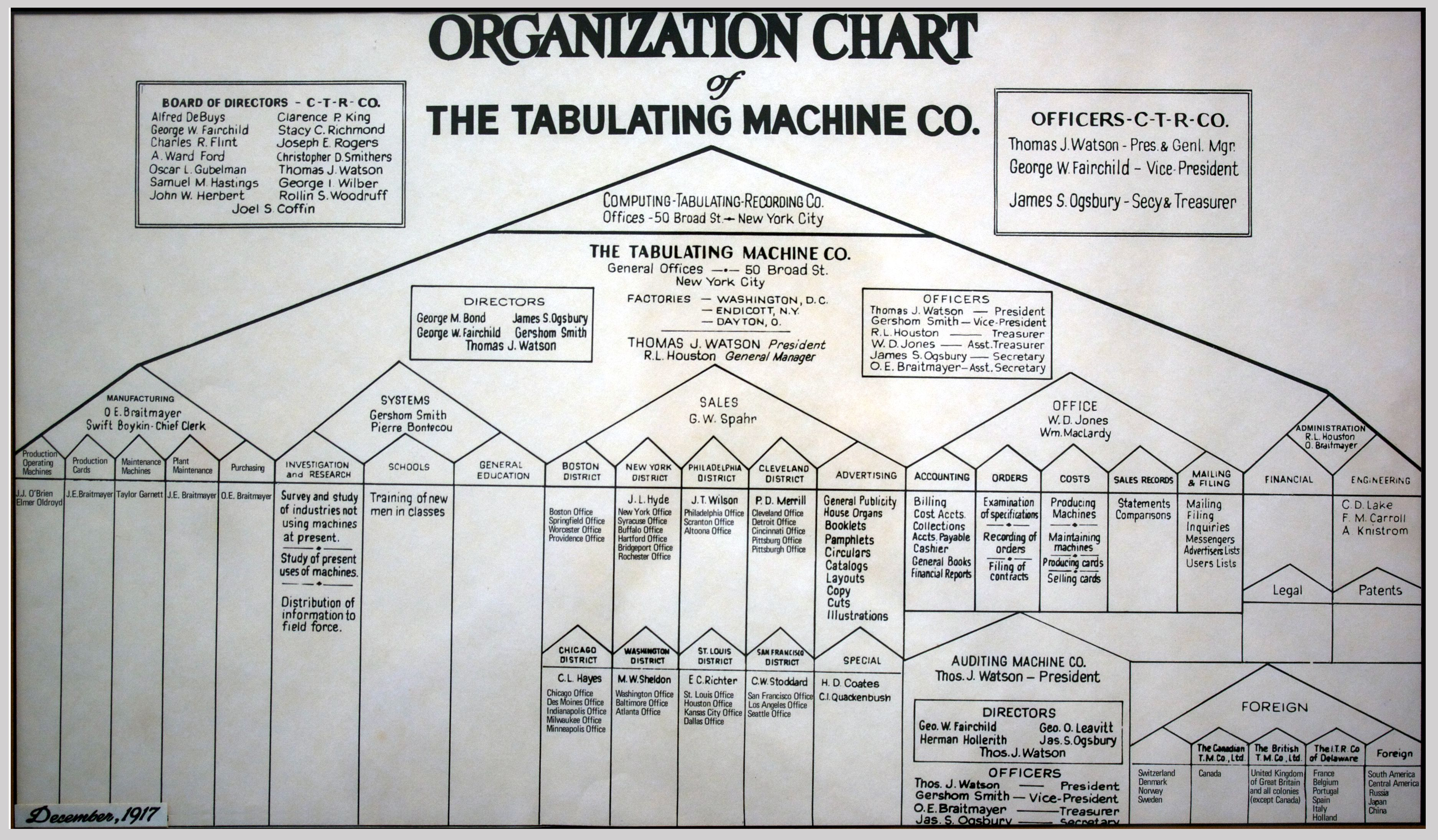
1917 organizational chart. This style of chart, pyramids divided into five parts, was required by Patterson and one of the many things Watson brought from NCR to CTR.

Thomas J. Watson Sr., along with 29 other NCR officials, had been convicted in 1913 of various antitrust violations for their roles in a widespread National Cash Register scheme to run used cash register retailers out of business (see NCR Corporation § Expansion). Watson's extortionate writings were used as evidence against him. That lesson taught Watson to keep very little in writing after that. In 1914, having been fired from NCR Corporation and with a prison sentence threatening his future, Thomas J. Watson approached Flint, a leading financier, for assistance in finding a similar job. Despite his apparently perilous situation, he was still very clear about the type of job he wanted. He had already turned down several offers. He wanted control of the business to earn a share of the profits. Flint offered him CTR. Flint was, as described earlier, a great promoter of trusts and was presumably less worried about Watson's impending jail sentence. The other members of the CTR board were less optimistic, asking who was to run the company while he was in prison. As a result, they only gave him the title of general manager. After Watson had been at CTR for 11 months, the Appeals Court ordered a retrial. Although he refused to sign a Consent Decree, a new trial never took place, and the board of CTR duly promoted him to the position of president. Among the many things Watson brought to CTR from NCR was the motto Think.

== Watson's strategies ==
Surprisingly, given his record at NCR and his later colossal influence on IBM, Watson initially maintained a very low profile (almost tantamount to seeking obscurity) for the next decade until 1924, when the chairman George W. Fairchild died, and he finally took over sole control. For the whole of the previous decade, in some ways uncharacteristically, he consistently deferred to Flint, Fairchild, and Hollerith.

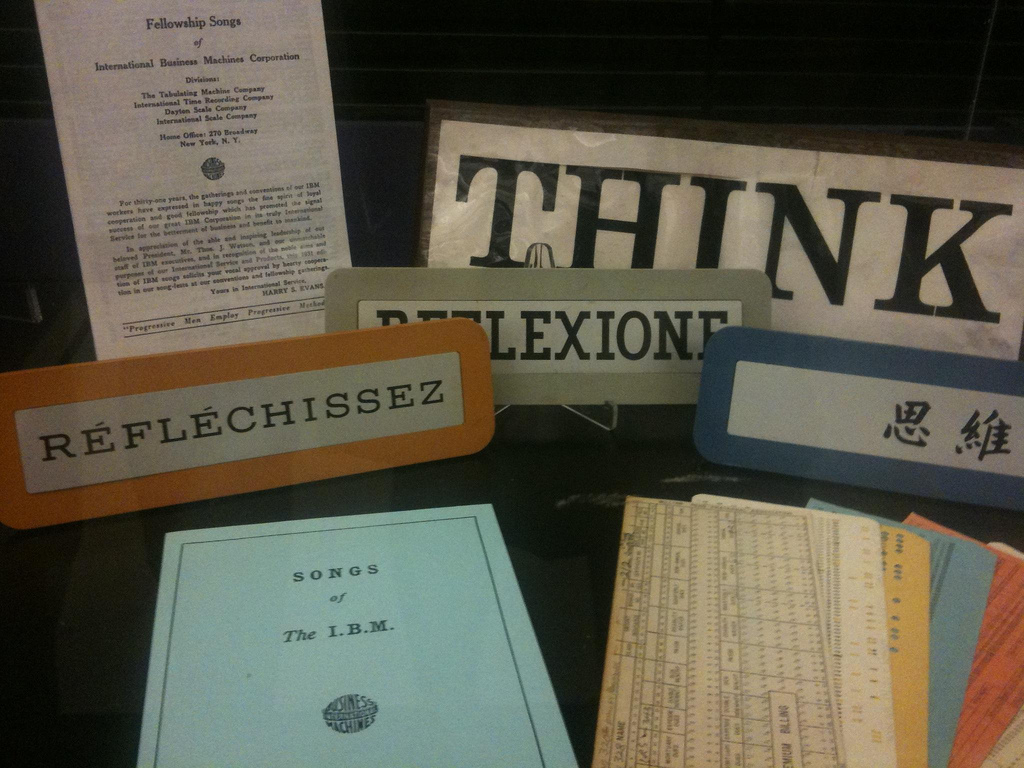
IBM songbooks with Think signs in several languages and punched cards

In the meantime, he took personal charge of 400 demoralized and poorly-supervised salesmen. His stated objective was to produce a sales force in the NCR mold and advanced machines that would be superior to any of the competitors' machines. He presented his 'competitive proposition' in several small meetings to the sales force. Despite the aggressive-sounding title, right from these beginnings, there was as much emphasis on the ethics and philosophies of the business as there was on sales techniques. In particular, he stressed sincerity, integrity, and loyalty, saying that they should do nothing that could be construed as 'unfair competition' and should conduct themselves in an 'honest, fair and square way' – something which would be radical even today. Musical events, even IBM songs, were introduced to improve and maintain employee morale.

The other philosophies that motivated CTR and IBM for the next three-quarters of a century were also evident. The company motto was to be 'We sell and deliver service'; CTR was to be in the business of genuinely assisting its customers. Watson strongly believed that both sides came out ahead when a sale was made.

== Organizational change and strategies ==
CTR was a company with three separate elements:

- Computing Scale interested Watson the least, and the largest element of this (Dayton Scale) was eventually sold off in 1933 to Hobart Manufacturing. After the sale, the company, to Watson's chagrin, began making money.
- Time Recording was at first the primary revenue earner and was used by Watson as a vehicle for diversification, though none of these was a great success.
- The tabulating business most interested Watson, perhaps because it was closest to his NCR experience. This was where he directed much of his attention, and by the early 1930s, this had indeed become the largest piece of CTR.

In the 1920s, while still under Fairchild's domination, Watson focused on achieving significant growth. Revenue grew from $4.2 million in 1914, when he took over, to a peak of $16 million in 1920. The price of this, however, was a precarious cash position. In 1921, sales fell to $10.6 million, and Watson faced a cash-flow crisis. Once again, Guaranty Trust was to fund and rescue CTR. Watson cut costs, including reducing research and development and laying off employees. He never again allowed his cash position to fall so low. He subsequently maintained a policy of low dividends, high revenues, and careful cost controls. He adopted very conservative accounting principles.

Hollerith, beginning with the 1890 census, had rented his machines so that his company could provide the maintenance necessary to ensure reliable operation. Watson recognized other benefits including the idea that renting equipment was inherently more stable since the income continued when equipment orders would otherwise have dried up. Less obviously, it forced sales personnel, aware that they might lose the rental, to maintain regular contact with customers, thus ensuring – even as early as the 1930s – that customer relationships were well-managed. This approach became central to IBM's activities.

After that, Watson deliberately lagged in introducing new products, though not on research. Even after competitors launched new products, he waited until the market was ripe for large-scale development. Watson recognized the importance of sound R&D, appointing James W. Bryce in 1922 to manage this (moving him from its Time Recording Division, which he had joined in 1915). However, Watson continued to be personally involved in R&D, not least through his insistence on rigorous standards.

"Watson had never liked the clumsy hyphenated title of the CTR" and chose to replace it with the more expansive title International Business Machines, first as a name for a 1917 Canadian subsidiary, then as a line in advertisements. For example, McClure's magazine, vol. 53, May 1921, ran a full-page ad with the following tag at the bottom:

International Time Recording Company of New York
Subsidiary of
Computing-Tabulating-Recording Company, New York
Makers of
International Business Machines

Patterson died in 1922, and Fairchild died on December 31, 1924. On February 5, 1924, Watson applied to list International Business Machines (IBM) on the New York Stock Exchange, and the name C-T-R disappeared. Watson began to mold the company in his image and took it to new levels of success for the next quarter of a century until he was 75. He celebrated his new status with the first Quarter Century Club. Even though CTR had only been going for 13 years, he based qualifications on the subsidiary companies. The holding company itself disappeared in 1933 after most of the subsidiaries had been merged into one company, IBM.

== See also ==
- History of IBM
- History of computing hardware
- Time clock
