= Charles Ranlett Flint =

American businessman (1850–1934)

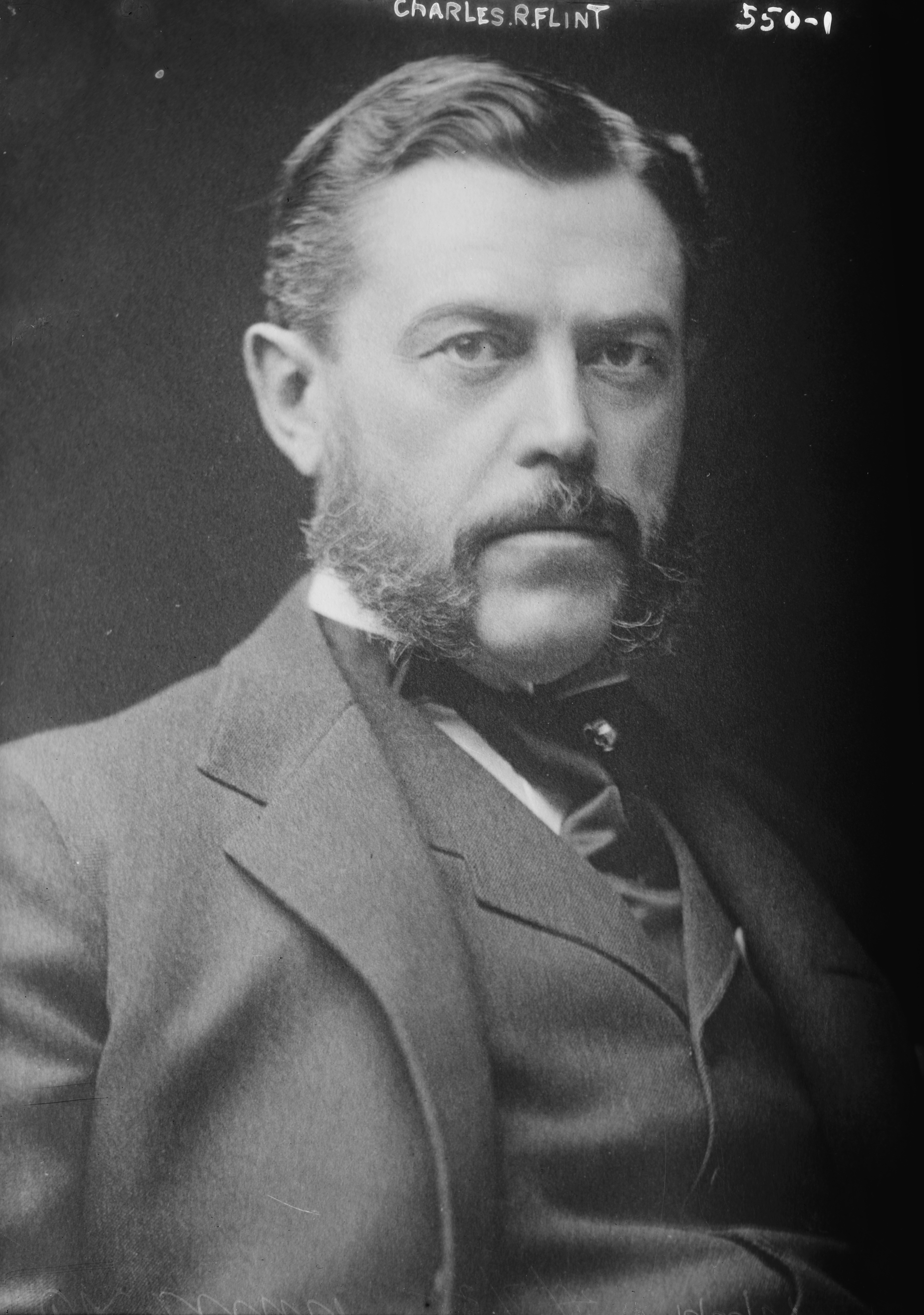
- Flint in 1907
- Born: January 24, 1850; Thomaston, Maine, U.S.
- Died: February 26, 1934 (aged 84); Washington, D.C., U.S.
- Other name: Computer King
- Education: Polytechnic Institute of Brooklyn (BS)
- Occupation: Financial capitalist – founder of Computing-Tabulating-Recording Company
- Spouses: Emma Kate Simmons (m. 1883; died 1926); Charlotte Reeves (m. 1927)

Charles Ranlett Flint (January 24, 1850 – February 26, 1934) was the founder of the Computing-Tabulating-Recording Company which later became IBM. For his financial dealings, he earned the moniker "Father of Trusts". He was an avid sportsman and member of the syndicate that built the yacht Vigilant, that was the U.S. defender of the eighth America's Cup and was the owner of the yacht Gracie.

== Early life and education ==
Flint was born on January 24, 1850, in Thomaston, Maine. His father, Benjamin Chapman, had changed the family name to Flint after being adopted by an uncle on his mother's side. The family moved from Maine to New York City where his father ran the family's mercantile firm Chapman & Flint, which had been founded in 1837. Flint married the composer Kate Simmons in 1883.

In 1868, Charles Flint graduated from Brooklyn Polytechnic Institute, which is now New York University Tandon School of Engineering, in Brooklyn. In 1871, he entered the shipping business as a partner in Gilchrest, Flint & Co., which became W. R. Grace and Company following a merger.

== Career ==
From 1876 to 1879, he served as the Chilean consul in New York City. He also served as consul general to the United States for Nicaragua and Costa Rica.

In 1892, he consolidated several companies to form U.S. Rubber. In 1893, he fitted out a fleet of naval ships for Brazilian Republic. He purchased the Esmeralda from the Chilean Navy and delivered it via Ecuador to Japan during the First Sino-Japanese War. In 1899, he repeated the success he had in forming U.S. Rubber by consolidating Adams Chewing Gum, Chiclets, Dentyne, and Beemans to form American Chicle. He was also responsible for the formation of The American Woolen Company that year. Some newspapers began to refer to him as "the Rubber King".

In 1911, he formed the Computing-Tabulating-Recording Company through an amalgamation of stock acquisition of four companies: Tabulating Machine Company, International Time Recording Company, Computing Scale Company of America, and the Bundy Manufacturing Company. Amalgamation was unusual at the time – Flint described it as an "allied" consolidation. In 1924, CTR was re-christened as International Business Machines. Flint served on the board of directors of IBM until he retired in 1930.

He died on February 26, 1934, in Washington, D.C.

== Legacy ==
Charles Flint was an avid sportsman and loved swimming, hunting, fishing, sailing, and aviation. He was one of seven founders of the Automobile Club of America. He held the world water speed record.

His Time magazine obituary stated he negotiated the Wright brothers' first sales of airplanes overseas. But it was the Wrights themselves, in sometimes contentious negotiations with Charles R. Flint & Co., who determined contract terms.

== Bibliography ==
- Flint, Charles Ranlett (1923). Memories of an Active Life: Men, and Ships, and Sealing Wax. G.P. Putnam's Sons.
- Flint, Charles Ranlett (1892). Industrial Combinations: Address by Charles R. Flint, Before the Commercial Club of Providence On the Evening of April 29th, 1892.
- Flint, Charles Ranlett; James J. Hill; James H. Bridge; S. C. T. Dodd; Francis B. Thurber (1902). The Trust, Its Book: Being a Presentation of the Several Aspects of the Latest Form of Industrial Revolution. Doubleday, Page & Co. 21
