= James Bryce (footballer) =

Scottish footballer (1884–1916)

Personal information
- Date of birth: 24 January 1884
- Place of birth: Ratho, Scotland
- Date of death: 30 August 1916 (aged 32)
- Place of death: West Flanders, Belgium
- Position: Half back

Senior career*
| Years | Team | Apps | (Gls) |
| 1907–1911 | Queen's Park | 21 | (0) |
- * Club domestic league appearances and goals

James Bryce (24 January 1884 – 30 August 1916) was a Scottish amateur footballer who played in the Scottish League for Queen's Park as a half back.

== Personal life ==
Bryce attended George Heriot's School between 1898 and 1900. As of 1901, Bryce was an apprentice law clerk. Prior to the First World War, he worked for the Scottish Union and National Insurance Company. Bryce served as a private in the Royal Scots and the Cameronians (Scottish Rifles) during the First World War and was killed in West Flanders on 30 August 1916. He is commemorated on the Ploegsteert Memorial to the Missing.

== Career statistics ==
Appearances and goals by club, season and competition
| Club | Season | League | | | Scottish Cup | | Other | | Total | |
| Club | Season | Division | Apps | Goals | Apps | Goals | Apps | Goals | Apps | Goals |
|---|---|---|---|---|---|---|---|---|---|---|
| Queen's Park | 1907–08 | Scottish First Division | 9 | 0 | 2 | 0 | 2 (Note: Appearances in Glasgow Merchants Charity Cup) | 0 | 13 | 0 |
| Queen's Park | 1908–09 | Scottish First Division | 2 | 0 | 0 | 0 | 0 | 0 | 2 | 0 |
| Queen's Park | 1909–10 | Scottish First Division | 7 | 0 | 0 | 0 | 1 | 0 | 8 | 0 |
| Queen's Park | 1910–11 | Scottish First Division | 3 | 0 | 0 | 0 | 0 | 0 | 3 | 0 |
| Career total | | | 21 | 0 | 2 | 0 | 3 | 0 | 26 | 0 |
