= Bundy Manufacturing Company =

Former American manufacturing company

- Industry: Timekeeper devices
- Founded: 1889
- Founders: Harlow E. Bundy, Willard L. Bundy
- Defunct: 1958
- Fate: Merged into the Simplex Time Recorder Company
- Successors: Simplex Time Recorder Company (1894); International Business Machines (1924)
- Headquarters: Binghamton, New York
- Parent: Simplex Time Recorder Company

The Bundy Manufacturing Company was a 19th-century American manufacturer of timekeeping devices that went through a series of mergers, eventually becoming part of International Business Machines and Simplex Time Recorder Company. It was the first time-recording company in the world to produce time clocks, colloquially known as 'Bundys'. The company was founded by the Bundy Brothers.

== Bundy brothers ==
Willard Legrand Bundy was born on 8 December 1845 in Otsego, New York, and died on 19 January 1907. His family later moved to Auburn, New York, where he worked as a jeweler and invented a time clock in 1888. He later obtained patents of many mechanical devices.

Harlow E. Bundy was born in 1856 in Auburn, New York. He was a graduate of Hamilton College. He died in 1916 in Pasadena, California, after retiring from business in 1915.

== Timeline ==
Unknown date: founding of Accurate Time Stamp Company.

Unknown date: founding of Chicago Time Register Company.

Unknown date: founding of Syracuse Time Recording Company.

1888: Willard L. Bundy invents the key recorder, applies it to time keeping for his employees.

1888: Dr. Alexander Dey invents the dial time recorder.

1889: Harlow E. Bundy and Willard L. Bundy incorporate the Bundy Manufacturing Company in Binghamton, New York: the first time-recording company in the world to produce time clocks. The Bundy Manufacturing Company begins with just eight employees and $150,000 capital.

1890: The Accurate Time Stamp Company (later renamed the Standard Time Stamp Company)- A Complete Automatic Time-Dating Stamp.

1893: Alexander Dey and relatives form the Dey Patents Co., later renamed the Dey Time Register Co. of Syracuse, New York.<

1894: Daniel M. Cooper patents the first card time-recorder. The Willard and Frick Manufacturing Company is organized to market Cooper's invention under the trade name "Rochester".

1896: George Winthrop Fairchild joins Bundy Manufacturing Company as both an investor and director.

1898: About 9,000 Bundy Time Recorders have been produced, advertised as solving "vexatious questions of recording employee time".

1898: A New Time Register, manufactured by the Chicago Time Register Company.

1899: Bundy Manufacturing Company acquires the Standard Time Stamp Company, manufacturers of a timestamp and a card recorder.

1900: The International Time Recording Company of New Jersey is formed: a merger of the time-recording business of Bundy Mfg., its subsidiary, the Standard Time Stamp Company, and Willard and Frick Mfg. Bundy Mfg. continues to manufacture other products, such as the Bundy Adding Machine (see 1905, 1910).

1901: ITR re-incorporates as a New York company.

1901: ITR acquires the Chicago Time Register Company: the first, "Merritt" autograph time-recorder company in the world and a manufacturer of key, card and autograph employee time recorders.

1903: The Bundy brothers have a falling-out. Willard L. Bundy moves to Syracuse, where he and his son form the W.H. Bundy Recording Company - manufacturing a clock similar to the ITR manufactured clocks.

1905: The Bundy Adding Machine is patented (advertised 1904-06)

1906: The Bundy Manufacturing Company and ITR relocate from Binghamton, New York to side-by-side locations in Endicott, New York.

1907: ITR acquires Dey Time Register Co. Manufacturing of dial time recorders moved from Syracuse to Endicott. ITR's motto is Safeguarding the Minute.

1907: Willard L. Bundy dies.

1908: ITR acquires the Syracuse Time Recording Co.

1910: "New York State Men: Biographic Studies and Character Portraits", Frederick S. Hills (ed), states that Harlow Bundy still holds the positions of treasurer and general manager of Bundy Mfg "now being engaged in the manufacture of adding machines, the time recording business having been merged in the International Time Recording Co., of Endicott, in 1901".

1910/11: Willard L. Bundy's son forms the W.H. Bundy Time Card Printing Co and is listed as the vice president of the Monitor Time Clock Company, Syracuse New York.

1911: Charles Ranlett Flint amalgamates (via stock acquisition)the Bundy Manufacturing Company, ITR, the Tabulating Machine Company and the Computing Scale Company into the new Computing-Tabulating-Recording Company (CTR) holding company. Fairchild is president of the new company and will later be chairman. Harlow Bundy is vice-president of the new company. The individual companies continue to operate using their established names.

1916: W.H. Bundy/Monitor firm sold to Simplex Time Recorder Company.

1924: CTR renamed International Business Machines

1933. IBM dispenses with the holding company structure, offices are consolidated and the subsidiary names, "Bundy", etc. are removed.

1935: Since 1907 or earlier, ITR (now the IBM Time Equipment Division) had published a magazine, Time, for employees and customers that IBM now renames THINK.

1958: IBM and its predecessor companies made clocks and other time recording products for 70 years, culminating in the 1958 sale of the domestic IBM Time Equipment Division to Simplex Time Recorder Company.

== See also ==
- George Winthrop Fairchild
