= List of mergers and acquisitions by IBM =

IBM logo

IBM has undergone a large number of mergers and acquisitions during a corporate history lasting over a century; the company has also produced a number of spinoffs during that time.

The acquisition date listed is the date of the agreement between IBM and the subject of the acquisition. The value of each acquisition is listed in USD because IBM is based in the United States. If the value of an acquisition is not listed, then it is undisclosed.

== Predecessor companies ==
Herman Hollerith initially did business under his own name, as The Hollerith Electric Tabulating System, specialising in punched card data processing equipment. In 1896 he incorporated as the Tabulating Machine Company.

- 1889 Bundy Manufacturing Company incorporated.
- 1891 Computing Scale Company incorporated.
- 1893 Dey Patents Company (soon renamed the Dey Time Register Company) incorporated.
- 1894 Willard & Frick Manufacturing Company (Rochester, New York) incorporated.
- 1896
  - Detroit Automatic Scale Company incorporated.
  - Hollerith incorporates the Tabulating Machine Company. Will be reincorporated in 1905.
- 1899 Standard Time Stamp Company acquired by Bundy Manufacturing Company.
- 1900
  - International Time Recording Company incorporated, acquiring the time-recording business of the Bundy Manufacturing Company and the Willard & Frick Manufacturing Company (Rochester).
  - Chicago Time-Register Company acquired by International Time Recording Company.
  - Dayton Moneyweight Scale Company acquired by Computing Scale Company.
  - Detroit Automatic Scale Company acquired by Computing Scale Company.
- 1905 Hollerith reincorporates as The Tabulating Machine Company.
- 1907 Dey Time Register Company acquired by International Time Recording Company.
- 1908 Syracuse Time Recorder Company acquired by International Time Recording Company.

== List ==
Since the 1960s or earlier, IBM has described its formation as a merger of three companies: The Tabulating Machine Company (1880s origin in Washington, DC), the International Time Recording Company (ITR; 1900, Endicott), and the Computing Scale Company of America (1901, Dayton, Ohio). However, there was no merger, it was an amalgamation, and an amalgamation of four, not three, companies. The 1911 CTR stock prospectus states that the Bundy Manufacturing Company was also included. While ITR had acquired its time recording business in 1900 Bundy had remained a separate entity producing an adding machine and other wares.

- The Tabulating Machine Company
- Computing Scale Corporation
- International Time Recording Company
- Bundy Manufacturing Company

CTR owned the stock of the four companies; CTR neither produced nor sold any product; the four companies continued to operate, as before, under their own names.

- 1917
  - American Automatic Scale Company acquired as International Scale Company.
  - CTR consolidates three already-existing Canadian companies: The Canadian Tabulating Machine Co., Ltd, the International Time Recording Co. of Canada, Ltd., and the Computing Scale Co. of Canada, Ltd., in a new holding company, International Business Machines Co., Ltd.
- 1921
  - Pierce Accounting Machine Company (asset purchase).
  - Ticketograph Company (of Chicago).
- 1923
  - Dehomag
- 1924
  - CTR was renamed "IBM".
- 1930 Automatic Accounting Scale Company.
- 1932 National Counting Scale Company.
- 1933 The separate companies were integrated in 1933 as IBM and the holding company eliminated.
- 1933 Electromatic Typewriters Inc. (See: IBM Electromatic typewriter)
- 1941 Munitions Manufacturing Corporation.
- 1959 Pierce Wire Recorder Corporation.
- 1964 Science Research Associates.
- 1974 CML Satellite Corporation; renamed Satellite Business Systems (SBS).
- 1984 ROLM
- 1986 RealCom Communications Corporation.
- 1993
  - CGI Informatique (France), bought in 1993, ran independently until 1996, and was then progressively absorbed by IBM, country by country, this process being achieved in 1999.
- 1994
  - Transarc (Transarc Corporation bought by IBM in 1994, became part of IBM proper in 1999 as the IBM Pittsburgh Lab)
- 1995
  - Lotus Development Corporation for $3.5 billion.
  - Information Systems Management Canada (ISM Canada)
  - K3 Group Ltd.
  - Chrysler Systems Leasing (February 1995)
- 1996
  - Wilkerson Group
  - Tivoli Systems, Inc. for $743 million.
  - Data Sciences Ltd, prior to 1991 comprising Thorn EMI Software, Datasolve and the Corporate Management Services Division of Thorn EMI, for £95 million.
  - Object Technology International (OTI) is acquired by IBM
  - Cyclade Consultants (Netherlands)
  - Fairway Technologies
  - Professional Data Management, Inc. / LifePRO
- 1997
  - Software Artistry for $200 million.
  - Unison Software.
  - Dominion Semiconductor (Manassas, VA) is created by forming a 50/50 joint venture with Toshiba to produce 64MB and 256MB DRAM chips. Administrative offices are located in Building 131 the former IBM Federal Systems campus now primarily owned by Lockheed Martin; the new state-of-the-art fabrication facility was built from on adjacent land.
- 1998
  - CommQuest Technologies.
  - DataBeam Corporation, Lexington, KY
  - Ubique Ltd., Israel
- 1999
  - Dascom Technologies (USA), A subsidiary of Dascom Holdings.
  - Mylex Corporation.
  - Sequent Computer Systems for $810 million.

Acquired on	Company	Business	Country	Value (USD)	Adjusted (USD)	References
June 7, 2001	Mainspring	Business strategy consulting	USA	$80,000,000	$150,000,000	
July 2, 2001	Informix Corporation	Database software	USA	$1,000,000,000	$1.818×10^{9}	
Jan 14, 2002	CrossWorlds Software, Inc.	Software	USA	$129,000,000	$231,000,000	
June 25, 2002	Metamerge	Identity management	NOR			
Aug 19, 2002	Trellisoft, Inc.	Enterprise storage	USA			
Sep 12, 2002	Holosofx, Inc.	Business Process Management	USA, EGY			
Oct 2, 2002	PWC Consulting from PricewaterhouseCoopers	Business Consulting and Technology Services	USA	$3,500,000,000	$6.265×10^{9}	
Oct 6, 2002	Access360	Software	USA			
Oct 7, 2002	EADS Matra Datavision	Product lifecycle management	USA			
Nov 15, 2002	Tarian Software	Records Management	CAN			
Feb 21, 2003	Rational Software Corporation	Software Development	USA	$2,100,000,000	$3.675×10^{9}	
May 14, 2003	Think Dynamics	Software	CAN			
July 1, 2003	Information Laboratory	Software	USA			
July 15, 2003	Aptrix	Software	AUS			
Oct 17, 2003	CrossAccess Corporation	Enterprise Information Integration	USA			
Nov 13, 2003	Productivity Solutions, Inc.	Automated Self-Checkout Systems	USA			
Dec 17, 2003	Green Pasture Software, Inc.	Content management software	USA			
April 6, 2004	Trigo Technologies	Product information management	USA			
April 7, 2004	Daksh e-Services	BPO Services	IND	$170,000,000	$290,000,000	
April 13, 2004	Business Continuity Services unit of Schlumberger	IT Services	FRA			
June 7, 2004	Candle Corporation	Infrastructure management	USA			
July 14, 2004	Alphablox Corporation	Business intelligence	USA			
July 29, 2004	Cyanea Systems	Application management software	USA			
Oct 7, 2004	Venetica	Enterprise Information Integration	USA			
Nov 19, 2004	Systemcorp ALG Ltd.	Project Portfolio Management (PPM) software	CAN			
Nov 23, 2004	Liberty Insurance Services	Business process services	USA			
Dec 1, 2004	Maersk Data and DMdata from Maersk	IT Services	DEN			
Dec 13, 2004	KeyMRO	Procurement Services	FRA			
Jan 7, 2005	Systems Research & Development	Identity management	USA			
March 16, 2005	Corio	Application Services	USA	$182,000,000	$300,000,000	
April 29, 2005	Ascential Software Corporation	Enterprise Information Integration	USA	$1,100,000,000	$1.813×10^{9}	
May 10, 2005	Gluecode Software	Application Server	USA			
June 23, 2005	Meiosys	Application Management	USA, FRA			
July 25, 2005	PureEdge Solutions, Inc.	Electronic Forms	CAN			
July 27, 2005	Isogon Corporation	Asset Management	USA			
Aug 2, 2005	DWL	Enterprise Information Integration	USA, CAN			
Oct 14, 2005	DataPower Technology, Inc.	Service Oriented Architecture (SOA)	USA			
Nov 1, 2005	iPhrase Systems, Inc.	Information management software	USA			
Nov 10, 2005	Network Solutions Pvt Ltd	IT Services	IND			
Nov 15, 2005	Collation, Inc.	Network management	USA			
Dec 20, 2005	Bowstreet, Inc.	Portal-based tools	USA			
Jan 27, 2006	ARGUS Semiconductor Software From INFICON	Semiconductor Manufacturing software	USA			
Jan 20, 2006	CIMS Lab, Inc.	IT Financial Management	USA			
Feb 8, 2006	Viacore, Inc.	Supply chain optimization	USA			
Feb 14, 2006	Micromuse, Inc.	Network management	USA	$865,000,000	$1.381×10^{9}	
March 16, 2006	Language Analysis Systems	Identity management	USA			
May 2, 2006	BuildForge, Inc.	Software Development	USA			
May 5, 2006	Unicorn Solutions, Inc.	Metadata management	USA			
June 27, 2006	Rembo Technology	Installation Software	SUI			
Aug 1, 2006	Webify Solutions, Inc	Service Oriented Architecture software	USA			
Sep 6, 2006	Global Value Solutions	IT Services	BRA			
Oct 4, 2006	DORANA product line from Ubiquity Pty Limited	Asset Management	AUS			
Oct 5, 2006	MRO Software	Asset Management	USA	$740,000,000	$1.182×10^{9}	
Oct 12, 2006	FileNet Corporation	Content management software	USA	$1,600,000,000	$2.555×10^{9}	
Oct 20, 2006	Internet Security Systems (ISS)	Information security	USA	$1,300,000,000	$2.076×10^{9}	
Oct 20, 2006	Palisades Technology Partners	Management consulting	USA			
Jan 22, 2007	Consul Risk Management, Inc.	Information security	NED			
Feb 13, 2007	Vallent Corporation	Telecommunications Management	USA			
March 1, 2007	Softek Storage Solutions Corporation	Data Mobility	USA			
March 18, 2007	BlackDot Networks, Inc.	Enterprise Data Consulting	USA			
April 20, 2007	Unicible	IT Services	SWI	$460,000,000	$714,000,000	
July 20, 2007	Watchfire Corporation	Security software testing	USA			
Aug 21, 2007	WebDialogs	Web conferencing and communications	USA			
Aug 31, 2007	DataMirror Corporation	Change Data Capture	CAN	$161,000,000	$250,000,000	
Sep 7, 2007	Qinnova, Inc.	Internet Protocol Television (IPTV)	CAN			
Sep 10, 2007	Princeton Softech, Inc.	Business intelligence	USA			
Oct 24, 2007	NovusCG	Storage Consulting and Technology Services	USA			
Jan 2, 2008	XIV	Enterprise storage	ISR	Over $300M	$448.6M	
Jan 18, 2008	AptSoft Corporation	Business intelligence	USA			
Jan 29, 2008	Solid Information Technology	Database software	USA, FIN			
Jan 31, 2008	Cognos	Business intelligence	CAN	$5,000,000,000	$7.477×10^{9}	
Jan 31, 2008	Arsenal Digital Solutions	Data backup services	USA			
Feb 15, 2008	Net Integration Technologies Inc.	Business Server Software	CAN			
March 11, 2008	Encentuate, Inc.	Enterprise Single Sign-On	USA			
April 3, 2008	Telelogic AB	Enterprise software development	SWE	$845,000,000	$1.264×10^{9}	
April 18, 2008	Diligent Technologies	Data De-duplication	USA	$200,000,000	$299,000,000	
April 21, 2008	FilesX	Application Recovery Software	USA, ISR			
April 29, 2008	InfoDyne Corporation	Data Feed Connectors	USA			
July 2, 2008	Platform Solutions	Mainframe, System Z technologies	USA			
July 28, 2008	ILOG	Business Rules Management Systems	FRA	$340,000,000	$508,000,000	
Nov 18, 2008	Transitive Corporation	Virtualization Software	USA, UK			
Jan 15, 2009	Outblaze's E-Mail Service Assets	Online messaging and collaboration	HKG			
May 5, 2009	Exeros Assets	Data Discovery Software	USA			
July 28, 2009	SPSS Inc.	Statistical analysis software	USA	$1,200,000,000	$1.801×10^{9}	
July 28, 2009	Ounce Labs	Source code analysis	USA			
September 22, 2009	RedPill Solutions	Analytics and Optimisation	SGP			
November 30, 2009	Guardium	Database monitoring and protection	USA, ISR			
December 16, 2009	Lombardi	Business Process Management	USA			
January 20, 2010	National Interest Security Company, LLC	Public sector consulting	USA			
February 3, 2010	Initiate Systems	Data integrity software	USA			
February 16, 2010	Intelliden Inc.	Network Automation software	USA			
March 1, 2010	Wilshire Credit Corporation Assets	Mortgage Business Processing Services	USA			
May 3, 2010	Cast Iron Systems	Cloud Integration	USA	$190,000,000	$281,000,000	
May 24, 2010	Sterling Commerce	Business software integration	USA	$1,400,000,000	$2.067×10^{9}	
June 15, 2010	Coremetrics	Web Analytics	USA			
July 1, 2010	BigFix, Inc.	Security and IT automation software	USA			
July 29, 2010	Storwize	Data Compression	USA	$140,000,000	$207,000,000	
August 10, 2010	Datacap	Data capture and Content Management	USA			
August 13, 2010	Unica Corporation	Marketing planning software	USA	$480,000,000	$709,000,000	
September 15, 2010	OpenPages	Integrated risk management solutions	USA			
September 20, 2010	Netezza	Data warehousing and analytics	USA	$1,700,000,000	$2.510×10^{9}	
September 27, 2010	BLADE Network Technologies	Networking	USA			
October 13, 2010	PSS Systems	Legal risk management	USA			
October 21, 2010	Clarity Systems	Financial governance	CAN	$350,000,000	$517,000,000	
March 22, 2011	Tririga Inc.	Facility and Real Estate Management	USA			
August 31, 2011	i2 Limited	Intelligence Analytics	UK			
September 1, 2011	Algorithmics Inc.	Risk Management	CAN	$387,000,000	$554,000,000	
October 4, 2011	Q1 Labs	Security Intelligence	USA			
October 12, 2011	Platform Computing	Cluster and Grid Management Software	CAN			
December 5, 2011	Cúram Software	Smarter Cities	IRL			
December 8, 2011	DemandTec	Cloud-based Retail Analytics	USA	$440,000,000	$630,000,000	
December 15, 2011	Emptoris	Supply Chain Analytics	USA			
January 4, 2012	Green Hat (software company)	Cloud based software testing	USA, UK			
January 31, 2012	Worklight	Software Development Firm	ISR	$70,000,000	$98,000,000	
April 13, 2012	Varicent	Compensation and Sales Performance Management Software Solutions	CAN			
April 25, 2012	Vivisimo	Enterprise Search Software	USA			
May 2, 2012	Tealeaf Technology	Customer Experience Analytics Software	USA			
August 16, 2012	Texas Memory Systems	Solid State Storage	USA			
August 27, 2012	Kenexa Corporation	Human Capital Solutions	USA	$1,400,000,000	$1.963×10^{9}	
September 24, 2012	Butterfly Software Ltd.	Data Analysis and Migration Software	UK			
December 19, 2012	StoredIQ	Big Data Analysis	USA			
February 1, 2013	Star Analytics	Business Analytics	USA			
April 22, 2013	UrbanCode	Software delivery automation	USA			
June 4, 2013	SoftLayer Technologies	Cloud Computing Infrastructure	USA	$2,000,000,000	$2.764×10^{9}	
July 9, 2013	CSL International	Cloud Computing	ISR	Not Disclosed	Not Disclosed	
August 15, 2013	Trusteer	Cyber Security	ISR	$1,000,000,000	$1.382×10^{9}	
September 19, 2013	Daeja Image Systems	Viewer for document management systems	UK	Not disclosed	Not disclosed	
October 1, 2013	The Now Factory	Mobile Networks Big Data Analytics	IRL	Not disclosed	Not disclosed	
October 3, 2013	Xtify	In-app mobile messaging and push notification tools	USA	Not disclosed	Not disclosed	
November 13, 2013	Fiberlink Communications	Mobile Device Management	USA	$330,000,000	$456,000,000	
December 19, 2013	Aspera, Inc.	Data Transfer Technology	USA	Not disclosed	Not disclosed	
February 24, 2014	Cloudant, Inc.	Database-as-a-Service	USA	Not disclosed	Not disclosed	
April 10, 2014	Silverpop Systems, Inc.	Behavioral Marketing Automation	USA	Not disclosed	Not disclosed	
May 19, 2014	Cognea	Cognitive computing (conversational artificial intelligence platform)	USA	Not disclosed	Not disclosed	
July 31, 2014	CrossIdeas	Cloud Security (Identity and Access Governance)	ITA	Not disclosed	Not disclosed	
August 11, 2014	Lighthouse Security Group	Cloud Security	USA	Not disclosed	Not disclosed	
March 4, 2015	AlchemyAPI	Natural language processing, big data	USA	Not disclosed	Not disclosed	
Mar 25, 2015	Lufthansa's IT Infrastructure Unit (LHSystems)	IT Infrastructure servicing Lufthansa and its subsidiaries (Technik, Cargo, LSG Skychefs, etc.); Although purchase price is difficult to find, IBM positioned this acquisition as "winning 'an outsourcing contract' worth US$ 1.25B"	USADE			
March 27, 2015	Blekko	Web Search Engine, Cognitive Computing	USA	Not disclosed	Not disclosed	
April 13, 2015	Explorys	Healthcare analytics	USA	Not disclosed	Not disclosed	
April 13, 2015	Phytel	Health management software	USA	Not disclosed	Not disclosed	
June 3, 2015	Bluebox	Private Cloud as a Service	USA	Not disclosed	Not disclosed	
July 23, 2015	Compose Inc.	Database as a Service	USA	Not disclosed	Not disclosed	
August 6, 2015	Merge Healthcare Inc.	Healthcare imaging software	USA	$1,000,000,000	$1.358×10^{9}	
September 10, 2015	StrongLoop Inc.	Mobile API capabilities	USA	Not disclosed	Not disclosed	
September 28, 2015	Meteorix LLC	Consulting services for Workday applications	USA	Not disclosed	Not disclosed	
October 28, 2015	The Weather Company digital assets	Weather data sources and analytics, related online and mobile products	USA	Not disclosed	Not disclosed	
November 3, 2015	Gravitant, Inc	Cloud brokerage software and cloud management	USA	Not disclosed	Not disclosed	
November 6, 2015	Cleversafe	Object-based storage software	USA	$1,309,000,000	$1.778×10^{9}	
December 8, 2015	Clearleap	Cloud-based video management	USA	Not disclosed	Not disclosed	
January 15, 2016	Iris Analytics	Real time transaction fraud detection	GER	Not disclosed	Not disclosed	
January 21, 2016	Ustream	Streaming video	USA	Not disclosed	Not disclosed	
January 28, 2016	Resource/Ammirati	Digital marketing and creative agency	USA	Not disclosed	Not disclosed	
February 2, 2016	Aperto AG	Digital marketing and creative agency	GER	Not disclosed	Not disclosed	
February 3, 2016	ecx.io AG	Digital marketing and creative agency	GER	Not disclosed	Not disclosed	
February 18, 2016	Truven Health Analytics	Provider of cloud-based healthcare data, analytics and insights	USA	$2,600,000,000	$3.488×10^{9}	
February 29, 2016	Resilient Systems	Cyber security, incident response platform	USA	Not disclosed	Not disclosed	
March 18, 2016	Optevia	Specialist provider of Microsoft Dynamics CRM based solutions and associated services to the public sector	UK	Not disclosed	Not disclosed	
March 31, 2016	Blue Wolf Group LLC	Salesforce systems integrator and professional services	USA	$200,000,000	$268,000,000	
June 1, 2016	EZSource	Application discovery and dashboard visualization	ISR	Not disclosed	Not disclosed	
September 29, 2016	Promontory Financial Group	Risk management and regulatory compliance	USA	Not disclosed	Not disclosed	
October 27, 2016	Sanovi Technologies	Hybrid cloud recovery	IND	Not disclosed	Not disclosed	
February 3, 2017	Agile 3 Solutions	Information security	USA	Not disclosed	Not disclosed	
May 2, 2017	Verizon – Cloud services	Cloud services	USA	Not disclosed	Not disclosed	
May 31, 2017	XCC (division of TIMETOACT)	Collaboration software	GER	Not disclosed	Not disclosed	
September 24, 2017	Cloudigo	Data Center Company	Israel	Not disclosed	Not disclosed	
October 5, 2017	Vivant Digital	Innovation Consultancy	AUS	Not disclosed	Not disclosed	
May 3, 2018	Armanta, Inc.	Aggregation/analytics software for financial services firms	USA	Not disclosed	Not disclosed	
June 15, 2018	Oniqua Holdings Pty Ltd.	Intelligent maintenance repair and operations (MRO) solutions	USAAUS	Not disclosed	Not disclosed	
July 9, 2019	Red Hat	Provider of open source software and solutions	USA	$34,000,000,000	$4.2815×10^{10}	
June 15, 2020	Spanugo	US-based provider of cloud cybersecurity posture management solutions	USA	Not disclosed	Not disclosed	
July 8, 2020	WDG	IBM to Acquire WDG Automation to Advance AI-Infused Automation Capabilities for Enterprises	BRA	Not disclosed	Not disclosed	
November 16, 2020	TruQua Enterprises	Acquisition enhances IBM's expertise in migrating financial platforms to SAP	USA	Not disclosed	Not disclosed	
November 18, 2020	Instana	Acquisition continues to advance IBM's Hybrid Cloud and AIOps strategy with Application Performance Management and enterprise Observability capabilities	USA	Not disclosed	Not disclosed	
December 15, 2020	Expertus Technologies Inc.	Digital payments provider	CAN	Not disclosed	Not disclosed	
December 21, 2020	Nordcloud	Acquisition enhances IBM's Hybrid Cloud Consulting capabilities	FIN	Not disclosed	Not disclosed	
January 11, 2021	7Summits	Acquisition drives digital transformations for Salesforce clients	USA	Not disclosed	Not disclosed	
January 14, 2021	Taos	Acquisition to expand hybrid cloud consulting services	USA	Not disclosed	Not disclosed	
April 15, 2021	myInvenio	Acquisition to help Organizations Use AI-powered Automation to Better Streamline Business Processes	ITA	Not disclosed	Not disclosed	
May 18, 2021	Waeg	Acquisition to expand Salesforce consulting services	Belgium	Not disclosed	Not disclosed	
June 17, 2021	Turbonomic	Acquisition to expand AIOps (the use of AI to automate IT Operations) to application and infrastructure observability. This also included SevOne, a network performance management solution as part of the acquisition.	USA	Estimated $1,500,000,000 - $2,000,000,000	Estimated $1.782×10^{9} - $2.376×10^{9}	
July 8, 2021	BoxBoat Technologies	DevOps consultancy and enterprise Kubernetes certified service provider	USA	Not disclosed	Not disclosed	
July 15, 2021	Bluetab Solutions Group, S.L.	Hybrid cloud data and analytics consulting	SPA	Not disclosed	Not disclosed	
January 11, 2022	Envizi	Sustainability data management and reporting platform	Australia	Not disclosed	Not disclosed	
February 15, 2022	Neudesic	Cloud services consultancy specializing primarily in the Microsoft Azure platform, along with bringing skills in multicloud	USA	Not disclosed	Not disclosed	
September 22, 2022	Dialexa	Digital product engineering services	USA	Not disclosed	Not disclosed	
December 2022	Octo		USA	Not disclosed	Not disclosed	
February 8, 2023	StepZen	GraphQL-as-a-Service	USA	Not disclosed	Not disclosed	
February 28, 2023	NS1	Network automation SaaS	USA	Not disclosed	Not disclosed	
May 16, 2023	Polar Security	Cyber Security, Data Security Posture Management (DSPM)	ISR	$60,000,000	$63,000,000	
June 26, 2023	Apptio	Software-as-a-service	USA	$4,600,000,000	$4.861×10^{9}	
December 18, 2023	Streamsets	Data integration	GER			
March 20, 2024	Pliant	Network and IT infrastructure automation	USA	Not disclosed	Not disclosed	
April 24, 2024	HashiCorp	Infrastructure and security automation	USA	$6,400,000,000	$6.568×10^{9}	
February 25, 2025	DataStax	AI applications	USA	Not disclosed	Not disclosed	
June 2, 2025	SeekAI	AI applications	USA	Not disclosed	Not disclosed	
October 28, 2025	Txture	Cloud Assessment and Transformation Software Platform	Austria	Not disclosed	Not disclosed	
December 8, 2025	Confluent	Data infrastructure	USA	$11,000,000,000	$1.1000×10^{10}	

== Divestures ==
- 1934 – Dayton Scale Division is sold to the Hobart Manufacturing Company.
- 1942 – Ticketograph Division is sold to the National Postal Meter Company.
- 1958 – Time Equipment Division is sold to the Simplex Time Recorder Company.
- 1974 – Service Bureau Corporation sold to Control Data Corporation
- 1984 – Prodigy, formerly a joint venture with Sears, Roebuck and Company.
- 1985 – Satellite Business Systems sold to MCI Communications
- 1988 – Copier/Duplicator business, including service and support contracts, sold to Eastman Kodak.
- 1990 – ARDIS mobile packet network, a joint venture with Motorola. Motorola buys IBM's 50% interest in 1994. Now Motient.
- 1991 – Lexmark (keyboards, typewriters, and printers). IBM retained a 10% interest. Lexmark has sold its keyboard and typewriter businesses.
- 1991 – Kaleida, a joint Multimedia software venture with Apple Computer.
- 1992 – Taligent, a joint software venture with Apple Computer.
- 1992 – IBM's personal computer manufacturing divisions, combined and spun off to form the autonomous subsidiary IBM Personal Computer Company (later IBM Personal Systems Group).
- 1992 – IBM Commercial Multimedia Technologies Group, spun off to form private company Fairway Technologies.
- 1992 – IBM sells its remaining 50 percent stake in the Rolm Company to Siemens A.G. of Germany.
- 1994 – Xyratex enterprise data storage subsystems and network technology, formed in a management buy-out from IBM.
- 1995 – Advantis (Advanced Value-Added Networking Technology of IBM & Sears), a voice and data network company. Joint Venture with IBM holding 70%, Sears holding 30%. IBM buys Sears' 30% interest in 1997. AT&T acquires the infrastructure portion of Advantis in 1999, becoming the AT&T Global Network. IBM retained business and strategic outsourcing portions of the joint venture.
- 1994 – Federal Systems Division sold to Loral becoming Loral Federal Systems. The Federal Systems Division performed work for NASA. Loral was later acquired by Lockheed Martin.
- 1996 – Celestica, Electronic Manufacturing Services (EMS).
- 1998 – IBM Global Network sold to AT&T to form AT&T Business Internet.
- 1999 – Dominion Semiconductor (DSC) IBM sells its 50% share to JV partner Toshiba. DSC becomes a wholly owned subsidiary of Toshiba.
- 2001 – Information Services Extended department, developer of specialized databases and software for telephone directory assistance, is spun off to form privately held company ISx, Inc (later sold to Local Matters).
- December 31, 2002 – IBM sells its HDD business to Hitachi Global Storage Technologies for approximately $2 billion. Hitachi Global Storage Technologies now provides many of the hardware storage devices formerly provided by IBM, including IBM hard drives and the Microdrive. IBM continues to develop storage systems, including tape backup, storage software and enterprise storage.
- December 2004 – Acquisition of the IBM PC business by Lenovo: Lenovo acquires 90% interest in IBM Personal Systems Group, 10,000 employees and $9 billion in revenue.
- April 3, 2006 – Web analytics provider Coremetrics acquires SurfAid Analytics, a standalone division of IBM Global Services. The deal was said to be in the "eight-figure" range, making it worth at least $10 million. (Note: Since then Coremetrics has in turn been acquired by IBM)
- January 25, 2007 – Three-year joint venture with IBM Printing Systems division and Ricoh to form new Ricoh-owned subsidiary, InfoPrint Solutions Company, for $725 million.
- September 2009 – IBM launches online business IT video advice service in association with GuruOnline.
- September 2009 – IBM sells its U2 multivalue database and application development products (created by VMark, UniData, System Builder and Prime Computer, obtained via the Informix acquisition) to Rocket Software
- April 2012 – IBM sells its Retail Store Solutions division (Point-of-Sales) to Toshiba TEC
- January 2014 – IBM sells its IBM System x business to Lenovo for $2.3 billion.
- October 2014 – IBM sells its Microelectronics (semiconductor) branch to GlobalFoundries. IBM will pay GlobalFoundries $1.5 billion over 3 years to take over the business.
- December 2014 – UNICOM Global acquires IBM Rational Focal Point and IBM Rational Purify Plus.
- January 2015 – IBM sells Algorithmics Collateral to SmartStream Technologies
- December 2015 – UNICOM Global acquires IBM Rational System Architect
- December 2018 – HCL Technologies to acquire Select IBM Software Products for $1.8B.
- July 2019 – IBM Watson Marketing business spins off into standalone company Acoustic, after acquisition by Centerbridge Partners
- October 8, 2020 – IBM announced it was spinning off the Managed Infrastructure Services unit of its Global Technology Services division into a new public company, an action expected to be completed by the end of 2021.
- November 3, 2021 Kyndryl. IBM distributed 80.1% of its Kyndryl shares to IBM shareholders.
- January 21, 2022 – IBM announced that it would sell Watson Health to the private equity firm Francisco Partners.
- August 22, 2023 — IBM announced that the private equity firm Francisco Partners would acquire The Weather Company assets.

== See also ==
- List of largest mergers and acquisitions
- Lists of corporate acquisitions and mergers
