= ThinkCentre =

Desktop computers by Lenovo

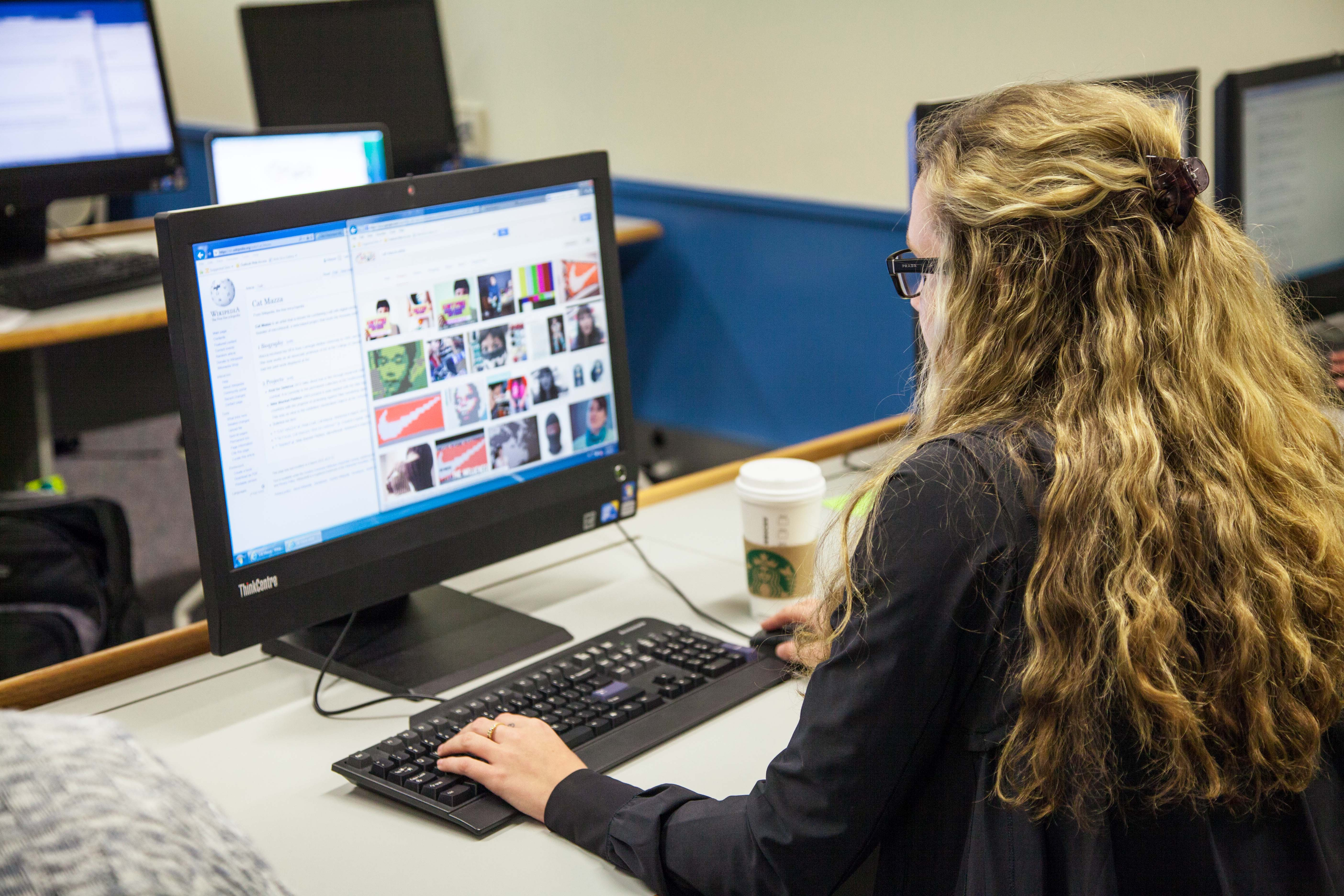
- ThinkCentre All-in-One
- Developer: IBM (2003–2004); Lenovo (2005–present)
- Manufacturer: IBM (2003-2004); Lenovo (2005-present)
- Type: Desktop/All-in-one
- Released: May 2003; 23 years ago
- Operating system: Microsoft Windows
- CPU: Intel Core, AMD Ryzen PRO
- Display: Up to 24" 1440p screen (AiO models only)
- Graphics: Nvidia GeForce, AMD Radeon, Intel Graphics
- Camera: 1080p camera (AiO models only)
- Power: Up to 750 W
- Platform: Think
- Online services: Microsoft 365, Adobe Creative Cloud, Adobe Acrobat
- Marketing target: Business purpose
- Predecessor: IBM NetVista
- Website: Efficient and Reliable Lenovo ThinkCentre Desktops | Lenovo US

ThinkCentre is a brand of business-oriented desktop computers and all-in-one computers, the early models of which were designed, developed and marketed by International Business Machines (IBM) since 2003. In 2005, IBM sold its PC business, including the ThinkCentre brand, to Lenovo. ThinkCentre computers typically include mid-range to high-end processors, options for discrete graphics cards, and multi-monitor support.

== History ==
=== Launch ===
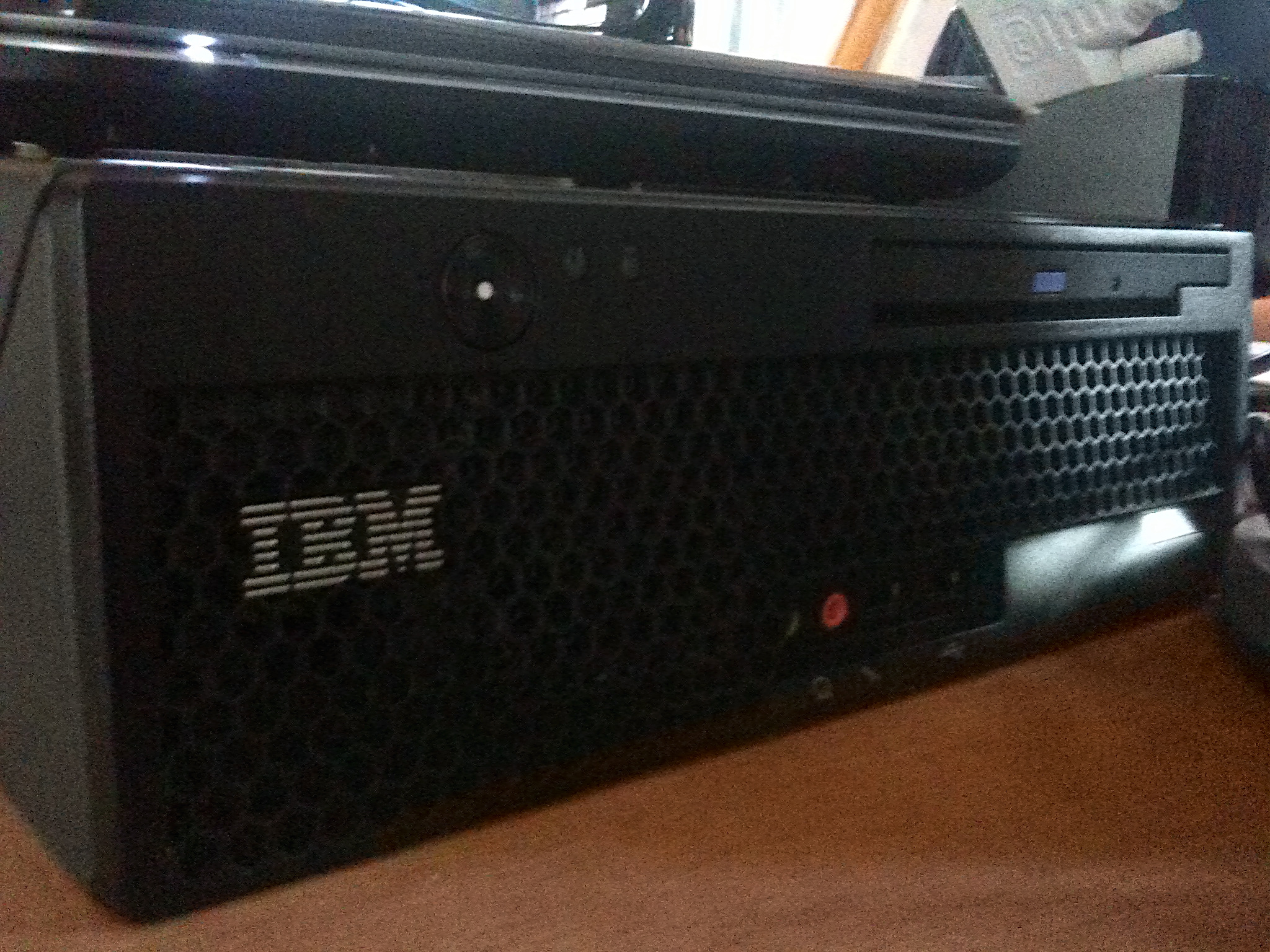
IBM ThinkCentre used as a Linux server

The ThinkCentre line of desktop computers was introduced by IBM in 2003. The first three models in this line were the S50, the M50, and A50p. All three desktops were equipped with Intel Pentium 4 processors. The chassis was made of steel and designed for easy component access without the use of tools. The hard disk was fixed in place by a 'caddy' without the use of screws. The caddy had rubber bumpers to reduce vibration and operational noise.

Additional updates to the desktops included greater use of ThinkVantage technologies. All desktop models were made available with ImageUltra. The three desktop models also included an 'Access IBM' button, allowing access to onboard resources, diagnostic tools, automated software, and links to online updates and services. Select models featured IBM's Embedded Security Subsystem, with an integrated security chip and IBM Client Security Software.

=== Acquisition by Lenovo ===
In 2005, after completing its acquisition of IBM's personal computing business, leading to the IBM/Lenovo partnership, IBM/Lenovo announced the ThinkCentre E Series desktops, designed specifically for small businesses. The ThinkCentre E50 was made available in tower and small form factor, with a silver and black design.

In 2005, Technology Business Research (TBR) observed an increase in the customer satisfaction rate for ThinkCentre desktops. According to TBR's "Corporate IT Buying Behavior and Customer Satisfaction Study” published in the second quarter of 2005, Lenovo was the only one of four surveyed companies that displayed a substantial increase in ratings.

In May 2005, the ThinkCentre M52 and A52 desktops were announced by Lenovo. These desktops marked the first time the ThinkCentre line incorporated dual-core processors and 64-bit technology. At the time of release, Lenovo also announced plans to incorporate Intel Active Management Technology (iAMT) in future products.

== Product series ==
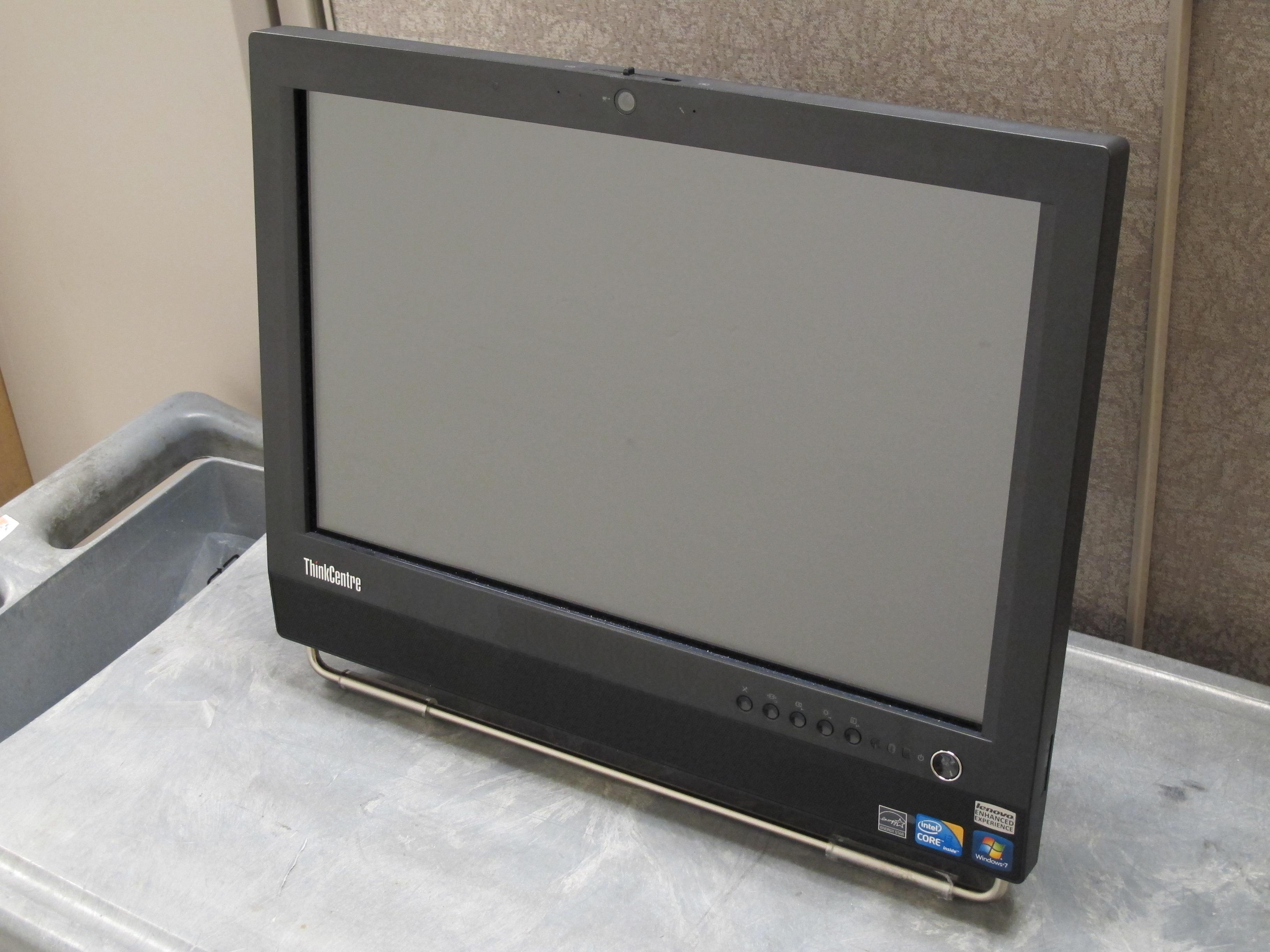
ThinkCentre Edge all-in-one (AIO) PC

The ThinkCentre desktops available from IBM/Lenovo are:

- ThinkCentre A series (SFF and AIO)
- ThinkCentre M series (in tower, SFF, and USFF)
- ThinkCentre Edge (in tower and AIO form factors)
- ThinkCentre Neo (in tower, SFF, tiny, and AIO)

== Notable models ==
=== ThinkCentre X1 ===
The ThinkCentre X1 is a mid-range all-in-one desktop computer announced by Lenovo at the 2016 International CES. The X1 is powered by a 6th generation Intel Core i7 processor paired with 16 gigabytes of 2333 MHz DDR4 RAM and a variety of storage media such as hard drives, hybrid drives, and solid state drives. The display uses 23.8-inch 1920x1080 panel with an anti-glare coating. A 1080p webcam is mounted just above the screen. Five USB 3.0 ports, DisplayPort video output, and an Ethernet port come standard. A memory card reader is optional. One variant of the X1 is a display-only device.

=== ThinkCentre Tiny-In-One II ===
The ThinkCentre Tiny-In-One II is Lenovo's second-generation all-in-one desktop computer. Its modular design allows its display and internals to be upgraded as needed. The ThinkCentre Tiny-In-One II comes in versions with 22-inch and 24-inch anti-glare displays with thin bezels and optional multitouch input. Both versions use 1920x1080 display panels. Two USB 3.0 ports, two USB 2.0 ports, one mini USB 2.0 port. and a Kensington security slot is included. Options for Microsoft Windows and Google's ChromeOS are both available.

=== Chromebox Tiny ===
The Chromebox Tiny is a small desktop computer with a Core i3-5005U processor, 4 gigabytes of memory, a 16 GB solid-state drive, integrated graphics that runs Google's ChromeOS. It was designed for education and business. Its largest side measures about 7 inches square. It is 1.4 inches thick and weighs 2.2 pounds. Computers with this form factor are called "one-liter" machines in some countries that use the metric system. The Tiny can be mounted on the back of monitors or placed on walls with a VESA mount. The Chromebox Tiny has two USB 3.0 ports on its front and two more on its rear. Dual-band 802.11ac Wi-Fi and Bluetooth 4.0 are both supported. An external antenna is included to improve reception. A mouse and keyboard come standard.

=== M83 Tiny ===
The ThinkCentre M83 Tiny is a ultra small-form-factor desktop computer released in 2014. The M83 Tiny uses an Intel Core i5 processor. It comes standard with one DisplayPort jack, and Ethernet port, five USB 3.0 ports, and a VGA port. There is a customizable port that can be configured with another DisplayPort jack, a serial port, another USB port, or an HDMI port. Wi-fi is 802.11ac. Wireless accessories are supported via Bluetooth 4.0.

=== S50 ===
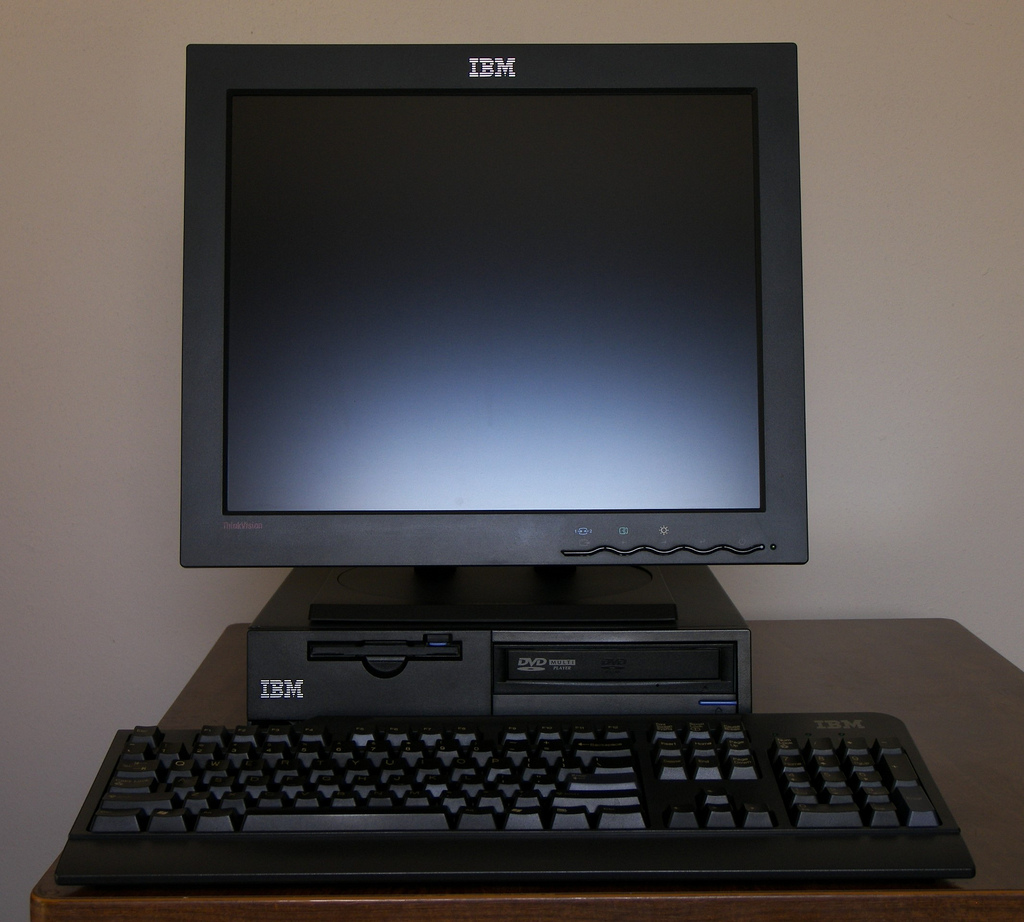
ThinkCentre S50

In 2004, an ultra-small version of the S50 was announced, the smallest desktop PC introduced until that time by IBM. The ultra-small ThinkCentre S50 desktop weighed approximately the same as IBM's first notebook (IBM 5140 PC Convertible). The ultra-small desktop was roughly the size of a New York City phonebook, or a box of cereal. The ultra-small desktop also featured a tool-free tool-less steel chassis and IBM ThinkVantage Technologies.

=== A series ===
==== A60 ====
In August 2006, the ThinkCentre A60 desktop was announced. It was the first ThinkCentre with AMD processors.

In September 2006, Lenovo announced that its ThinkPad, ThinkCentre, and ThinkVision products received high ratings from EPEAT. A total of 42 products were rated by EPEAT. The ThinkCentre desktops received an overall rating of EPEAT silver. This indicated that all criteria for environmentally safe computing had been met – including the minimum requirements and additional optional implementations. Some of the criteria met included reduced levels of cadmium, mercury, and lead, energy efficiency, and reduced greenhouse gas emissions.

In September 2006, Lenovo announced several desktops in the ThinkCentre line, including the M55p, M55, M55e, A55 and A53.

==== A55 ====
In January 2007, the ThinkCentre A55 small-form-factor desktop was announced by Lenovo. The A55 was approximately 64% smaller than Lenovo's traditional tower desktops and 25% smaller than Lenovo's traditional small desktops. In September 2007, Lenovo announced the ultra-small-form-factor A61e.

Also in September 2007, two new M Series desktops were announced: the M57 and M57p.

==== A58 and M58e ====
In March 2009, two small, low-cost desktops were announced by Lenovo: the ThinkCentre A58 and the ThinkCentre M58e. The A58 desktop was designed for small and medium businesses, while the M58e was designed for medium-sized and large enterprises. The desktops were made available in both tower and small form-factor versions.

== Timeline ==
Timeline of the IBM Personal Computer

Asterisk (*) denotes a model released in Japan only

== See also ==
- ThinkCentre: A Series, M Series and Edge Series
- ThinkPad
- ThinkStation
