= HCL AppScan =

Web security testing and monitoring tools

- Developer(s): HCLSoftware, a division of HCLTech
- Stable release: Version 10.0
- Type: Security testing
- License: Proprietary
- Website: www.hcl-software.com/appscan

HCL AppScan (previously known as IBM AppScan) is a family of desktop and web security testing and monitoring tools, formerly a part of the Rational Software division of IBM. In July 2019, the product was acquired by HCLTech and is currently marketed under HCLSoftware, a product development division of HCLTech.

== History ==
AppScan was originally developed by Israeli software company Sanctum Ltd. (formerly Perfecto Technologies) and was first released in 1998. A year later, Sanctum expanded its web security service and launched an Application firewall, called AppShield. The first version of AppShield was developed by a team led by Gili Raanan, and was running on a dedicated Linux server.

AppScan version 2.0 was released in February 2001, adding a policy recognition engine and knowledge database, an automatic and customizable crawler engine, and an attack simulator. Version 3 was released in April 2002, adding collaborative testing capabilities, where different tasks can be assigned to different testers; and a number of user interface enhancements in both the scanning and reporting sections of the program. By 2003 AppScan was used by over 500 enterprise customers and had nearly $30 Million (USD) in annual revenue.

In July 2004, Sanctum was acquired by Massachusetts based company Watchfire, which developed a web applications management platform named WebXM. AppScan became Watchfire's flagship product and Sanctum's R&D center in Herzliya, Israel, became Watchfire's main R&D location.

In June 2007, Watchfire was acquired by IBM and incorporated into the Rational Software product line, enabling IBM to cover more of the application development lifecycle with the addition of a new tool to help developers further bolster the security of the application itself. Watchfire R&D center was incorporated into IBM R&D Labs in Israel.

In 2009 IBM acquired Ounce Labs and added yet another tool to AppScan to find and correct vulnerabilities in software source code. This new version was quickly re-packaged as a separate edition of AppScan: AppScan Source Edition.

In June 2019, HCL acquired select IBM collaboration, commerce, digital experience, AppScan and BigFix solutions.
