= Software performance management =

In IT operations, software performance management is the subset of tools and processes in IT Operations which deals with the collection, monitoring, and analysis of performance metrics. These metrics can indicate to IT staff whether a system component is up and running (available), or that the component is behaving in an abnormal way that would impact its ability to function correctly—much like how a doctor may measure pulse, respiration, and temperature to measure how the human body is "operating". This type of monitoring originated with computer network components, but has now expanded into monitoring other components such as servers and storage devices, as well as groups of components organized to deliver specific services and Business Service Management).

== Types and categories ==
Types and categories of IT performance management include:

- Network performance management: a set of functions that evaluate and report the effectiveness of the network or network element, and the behavior of telecommunications equipment. It also includes a set of subfunctions, such as gathering statistical information, maintaining and examining historical logs, determining system performance under natural and artificial conditions, and altering system modes of operation.
- System performance management includes monitoring and management of utilization of operating systems resources, including CPU, memory, I/O, and disk usage. This includes both physical and virtual systems. In cloud environments events can be defined using monitoring software and actions automated with cloud management application programming interfaces.
- Application performance management: the discipline within systems management that focuses on monitoring and managing the performance and availability of software applications. APM looks at workflow and related IT tools deployed to detect, diagnose, remedy, and report on application performance issues to ensure that application performance meets or exceeds the expectations of end-users and businesses.
- Self-learning performance management: the use of technology to help automate the performance management of information technology systems. This is done through the use of software that employs applied mathematics (such as statistics, time series analysis, and forecasting), automated baselining, neural networks, pattern recognition, and other similar technologies. The intent is to automate manual processes and "fixed baseline" approaches used to determine when IT systems are operating out of normal ranges, which would indicate potential system problems. Self-learning performance management is complementary to the disciplines of systems management, network performance management, and application performance management, and is sometimes referred to by IT analyst firms like Gartner by the term behavior learning technology or behavior learning software.
- Business transaction management (BTM): the discipline within systems management that monitors business transactions across the data center in order to manage IT performance.

== Uses ==
=== Outage prevention or remediation ===
- Alerts as to which components may be failing
- Isolates failing components
- Provides details to incident management process to speed the repair or remediation process
- Logs provided can provide preventative measures for future incidents that might occur, and leverage capacity

=== Service level management ===
- Provides real-time and historical data to determine whether or not a service level agreement is being met
- Provides historical data on component usage and workload to help IT organizations determine appropriate costs and charges for internal and external customers
- Allows for clients to ensure that what is being delivered to them is up to their quality standards
- Allows to see which components aren't meeting the standards of your business or their clientele

=== Capacity planning ===
- Provides historical data on IT component workloads and usage to help information technology planning staff increase, consolidate, or reduce resources in the future
- Provides foresight for companies to leverage resources and plan adequately for projects or other initiatives
- More specific allocation allows for better performance and quality of product for your business or client.

== Vendors ==
Companies who offer IT performance management tools include Xangati, TeamQuest, IBM, CA, BMC, Sightline Systems, SevOne and HP Software Division.
