= ThinkCentre M series =

Series of Desktop PC's by Lenovo

The M-series of desktops are part of Lenovo's ThinkCentre product line. Lenovo has released M-series desktops in multiple form factors, ranging from traditional tower, small form factor, to ultra small form factor, and all-in-ones (AIOs). Formerly an IBM brand, Lenovo acquired the ThinkCentre desktop brand following its purchase of IBM's Personal Computing Division (PCD) in 2005.

== 2003 ==
In 2003, IBM redesigned and re-launched their ThinkCentre product line. The first desktop released was an M-series desktop – the M50.

=== M50 ===
The first desktop in IBM's redesigned ThinkCentre line was the M50, announced in 2003. The desktop offered the following specifications:

- Processor: Intel Pentium 4 3.0 GHz
- RAM: 256 MB PC2700 DDR
- Storage: 40 GB 7200 RPM
- Graphics: Intel Extreme 2 (integrated, 64MB of shared video RAM)
- Optical drive: 48x CD-ROM
- Audio: SoundMAX Cadenza audio without speakers
- Operating system: Microsoft Windows XP Professional
- USB ports: eight USB 2.0 Ports

While the desktop was made available as a consumer PC, it was more suited to a corporate environment, with the limited storage and graphics capabilities.

== 2005 ==
The ThinkCentre desktop released by Lenovo in 2005, following its acquisition of IBM's PCD was the M52.

=== M52 ===
The ThinkCentre M52 desktop was announced in May 2005 following Lenovo's acquisition of IBM's Personal Computing Division. PC World called the M52 desktop, "A corporate machine for the security conscious business user looking for stability and reliability". The M52 desktop was equipped with a 3 GHz Pentium 4 processors, an 80 GB hard disk drive, up to 4 GB of RAM, eight USB 2.0 ports, two serial ports, a Gigabit Ethernet connection, VGA output, and a chassis that did not require tools to open − a toolless chassis.

== 2006 ==
The ThinkCentre M55, M55p, and M55e were announced by Lenovo in September 2006.

=== M55 ===
The ThinkCentre M55 received a positive review from PC World, with the reviewer stating that "The Lenovo ThinkCentre M55 9BM is a compact and quiet business PC that keeps maintenance simple and makes upgrades easy. Its design and functions are well-suited to an office environment and we think it's a good choice for any business searching for a uniformed PC roll-out."

The desktop offered the following specifications:

- Processor: Intel Core 2 Duo E6300 1.86 GHz
- RAM: 1 GB of DDR2
- Storage: 80 GB

Despite the fact that the desktop was capable of handling Windows Vista Business, it was preloaded with Windows XP. While the chassis was similar to previous ThinkCentre desktops, it was made smaller to fit better in office spaces.

=== M55p ===
The ThinkCentre M55p desktop offered the following specifications:

- Processor: Intel Core 2 Duo E6600
- RAM: 1 GB PC2-5300 DDR2
- Storage: 160 GB 7200 RPM SATA
- Graphics: Intel GMA 3000 Integrated Graphics (256 MB shared video RAM)
- Audio: Intel HD Audio
- Optical drive: 16x Dual Layer DVD reader/writer
- USB ports: ten USB 2.0 ports
- Operating System: Windows XP Professional

It was described by About.com as being "a very solid system for business users" and a "general purpose PC" for consumers. However, both multimedia performance and storage space were criticized.

=== M55e ===
The ThinkCentre M55e desktop was equipped with:

- Processor: Intel Core 2 Duo E6300 1.86 GHz
- RAM: 2 GB
- Graphics: Intel GMA 3000 (integrated)
- Storage: 250 GB hard disk drive
- Operating System: Microsoft Windows Vista Business
- Display: 22 inch LED widescreen

PCMag listed the pros as being the dual-core processor, small form factor, enterprise-class hardware, ThinkVantage Technologies, and the three year on-site warranty. The price, the 90-day subscription to Symantec Client Security, and the lack of a DVD writer were listed as the cons of the desktop.

== 2007 ==
The ThinkCentre M-series desktops released by Lenovo in 2007 were the M57 and M57p.

=== M57 and M57p ===
The ThinkCentre M57 and M57p desktops were announced in September 2007 by Lenovo. These were the first desktops from a manufacturer to receive a GREENGUARD certification. In addition, both desktops were EPEAT Gold] and Energy Star 4.0 rated. They were also the first ThinkCentre desktops to incorporate recycled material from consumer plastics. The desktops were equipped with up to Intel Core 2 Duo processors, up to 2 GB DDR2 RAM, integrated graphics, and up to 160 GB hard disk drive.

== 2008 ==
=== M57 Eco and M57p Eco ===
The ThinkCentre M57 Eco and M57p Eco were announced by Lenovo in March 2008. These were eco-friendly versions of the M57 and M57p, which were released in 2007. The desktops were dubbed "eco" and had an ultra-small form factor with low power consumption. According to Desktop Review, the M57 used a fraction of the power needed by standard desktops, and a little more than that of an energy-saving notebook.

The M57 desktop offered the following specifications:

- Processor: Intel Core 2 Duo E8400 3 GHz
- Graphics: Intel X3100 (integrated)
- RAM: up to 4 GB PC2-5300 DDR2 SDRAM
- Storage: 160 GB 7200 RPM
- Optical Drive: DVD Burner
- Operating System: Windows Vista Business (32-bit)
- Dimensions (inches): 11.8 x 9.4 x 3.2
- Weight: 7 lbs

The M57p eco desktop had the same specifications as the M57 eco.

=== M58 ===
The M58 and M58p were announced by Lenovo in October 2008.

The desktop offered the following specifications:

- Processor: 2.33 GHz Intel Core 2 Quad
- Storage: up to 500 GB hard disk drive
- RAM: 2 GB RAM
- Optical drive: DVD writer
- Graphics: Intel GMA 4500
- Audio: Intel HD audio
- USB ports: eight USB ports
- Operating System: Microsoft Windows Vista

=== M58p ===
The M58p was received by Desktop Review in a manner similar to the M58, with the reviewer stating, "The M58p is designed to meet all the stringent requirements commercial organizations have while still providing that Lenovo touch through OEM software, warranties and support."

The M58p desktop offered the following specifications:

- Processor: 3.00 GHz Intel Core 2 Duo E8400
- RAM: 4 GB 1066 MHz DDR3 SDRAM
- Storage: 250 GB 7200 RPM SATA
- Audio: integrated HD audio
- Speakers: integrated speakers
- Graphics: integrated graphics
- Operating System: Windows Vista Home Premium
- Customized with best options: (SFF)
  - Processor: Up to Intel Core 2 Quad Q9650 (3.0 GHz Clock)
  - RAM: Up to 8 or 16 GB 1066 MHz (updating BIOS) DDR3 Memory
  - Storage: Up to 2x1 TB 7200 RPM SATA
  - Graphics: Up to GT 1030 or GTX 750 Ti Graphics Card
  - Operating system: Genuine Windows 10 Pro (64-bit)

The pros of the system were listed by Desktop Review as the high-end configuration, the handle for easy movement, and the capacity for expansion. The cons were listed as being the price and the lack of DVI ports.

== 2009 ==
The ThinkCentre M-series desktop released by Lenovo in 2009 was the M58e. The Small Form Factor version uses a BTX motherboard.

=== M58e ===
Lenovo announced the ThinkCentre M58e desktop in March 2009. The desktop offered the following specifications:

- Processor: Intel Core 2 Duo E8400 3 GHz
- RAM: up to 4 GB
- Graphics: Intel GMA 4500 MHD (integrated)
- Storage: 320 GB
- Operating System: Microsoft Windows Vista Business

The desktop was EPEAT Gold rated and met Energy Star requirements. The M58e was also compatible with solar charger packs. PC Mag summarized its review of the desktop by saying "The Lenovo ThinkCentre M58e is a middle-of-the-road business PC, both in performance and features, though it does have the added benefits of Intel vPro and IT-friendly features. It's certainly worth a look if you need a PC environment that can grow with your business."

== 2010 ==
The ThinkCentre M-series desktops released by Lenovo in 2010 were the M70e, M70z, M90, and M90z.

=== M70e ===
The M70e desktop was released by Lenovo in 2010 with the following specifications:

- Processor: 3 GHz Intel Core 2 Duo E8400
- Chipset: Intel G41
- RAM: up to 4 GB 1066 MHz DDR3
- Storage: 500 GB SATA
- Graphics: Intel Graphics Media Accelerator X4500
- Audio: Integrated HD audio
- Operating System: Microsoft Windows 7 Professional (64 bit)

=== M90 ===
The M90 desktop was released by Lenovo in 2010 with the following specifications:

- Processor: 3.33 GHz Intel Core i5
- RAM: up to 4 GB DDR3
- Storage: up to 500 GB 7200 RPM SATA
- Optical drive: DVD reader/writer
- Graphics: Intel GMA X4500
- Form factor: Small form factor (SFF)
- Dimensions (inches): 10.78 x 9.37 x 3.07

The M90 desktop received the "PCPro Recommended" award upon release, with an overall rating of five of six stars. The desktop was summarized as, "Expensive but, thanks to superb design and power, worth the cash for demanding business users".

=== M90z ===
Also released in 2010, the M90z was an all-in-one (AIO) desktop released by Lenovo. The AIO desktop offered the following specifications:

- Processor: 3.2 GHz Intel Core i5-650
- RAM: 4 GB
- Storage: 500 GB
- Graphics Card: Intel GMA HD
- Optical Drive: Dual-Layer DVD reader/writer
- Display: 23 inch HD widescreen (maximum resolutions of 1920x1080)
- USB ports: 6 USB 2.0

PCMag listed the pros of the desktop as the compact design, HD display, support for two monitors, simple multi-touch interface, good component mix, stand options, and easy servicing. The cons were listed as the dull colors on videos because of the matte screen, the lack of an eSATA port, and the need for an adapter when using external DVI.

Computer Shopper summarized the capabilities of the M90z with the statement, "In our test configuration, the business-oriented M90z is overkill for most office tasks. Configuration options, however, can bring down the price while still delivering a peppy big-screen office PC."

== 2011 ==
=== M71e ===
The ThinkCentre M71e desktop was described by PCWorld as being "a basic PC designed for small and medium-sized businesses". The desktop was powered by an Intel Core i5-2500 processor and included 4 GB of DDR3 RAM, a 500 GB 7200 RPM hard disk drive, and AMD Radeon HD 5450 discrete graphics. The desktop was indicated to be good for everyday office tasks and offering suitable responsiveness. Despite the presence of three fans, the desktop was not "annoyingly loud".

The DVD bay was powered by a strong motor; the drive tray would eject and close almost as soon as the button was pressed with very little lag. The desktop was, overall, described as being a simple machine with a decent configuration, without "fancy features" such as a USB 3.0 port. Some legacy features, such as a PS/2 port were available on the desktop. Also, the assembly of the machine was described as "basic", with a messy internal appearance.

The one year on-site warranty was indicated as being one of the best features on the desktop. Other features on the desktop included four USB 2.0 ports, a Gigabit Ethernet port, DVI, DisplayPort, and analogue audio ports.

=== M71z ===
The M71z was described by IT Pro as being "a rare business all-in-one with a touchscreen." The default configuration offered a non-touch screen, with multi-touch as an optional upgrade. The touchscreen was described as being precise and responsive, with Lenovo applications using suitably large icons. However, the applications themselves were indicated to have not been optimized for touch control. Further, there were no touch-specific applications commonly found on consumer touchscreen devices.

The 1600 x 900 display was indicated to be "spacious enough" with acceptable color accuracy. However, the brightness level was indicated to be low, at 210.8 cd/m2.

The processing and graphical power was acceptable for everyday office tasks, with the all-in-one powered by an Intel Core i3-2100 processor and Intel HD 2000 integrated graphics. The use of graphics- and processing-intensive software was indicated to be a challenge, because of the lack of discrete graphics. Power consumption, heat levels, and noise levels were low. IT Pro commented that "the fans never became irritatingly loud. In fact, we had to press our ears up against the computer to even hear them."

The build of the all-in-one was described as being good, with strong, matte black plastic. Both keyboard and mouse were called reliable, with the keyboard described as responsive.

Detailed specifications of the M71z all-in-one are as follows:

- Processor: Intel Pentium G260 (2.6 GHz)
- Operating system: Microsoft Windows 7 Professional (64-bit)
- Screen: 20-inches (non-touch by default; optional multi-touch upgrade)
- RAM: Up to 8 GB
- Storage:
  - 1 TB 7200 RPM SATA II
  - 160 GB SSD
- WiFi: 802.11 a/b/g/n

=== M75e ===
The ThinkCentre M75e desktop was praised by SlashGear for its processing power and small form factor. In terms of design, the desktop was similar to other ThinkCentre products from Lenovo, with no unnecessary styling and designs. Components could be accessed by removing two screws on the chassis.

The desktop contained an AMD Athlon II X4 640 processor, 4 GB of DDR3 RAM, a 500 GB hard disk drive, and ATI Radeon HD 3000 discrete graphics. The desktop was indicated by Lenovo to be "multi-monitor friendly", with the capacity to power two displays even with the basic configuration. An optional half-height graphics card also allowed two additional monitors to be powered, for a total of four independent displays.

The primary points of criticism were a direct result of the desktop's small form factor. Although the space for cooling was reduced, the M75e did not exceed stable temperatures. However, noise was a concern. The PC's fan would only run for a short duration at a high speed, making it louder than some desktops and workstations.

Detailed specifications of the ThinkCentre M75e desktop are as follows:

- Processor: up to AMD Phenom II X4 B9x series
- Operating system: Microsoft Windows 7 (Professional/Home Premium/Home Basic)
- Chipset: AMD 750G + SB710
- Storage: up to 500 GB 7200 RPM hard disk drive
- RAM: up to 16 GB DDR3
- Graphics:
  - ATI Radeon 3000 (integrated)
  - NVIDIA Quadro FX380
  - NVIDIA GeForce 310
  - NVIDIA GeForce 310

=== M77 ===
Announced on October 28, 2011, the ThinkCentre M77 could be upgraded to include AMD's FX processors and up to 16GB of RAM. According to Tom Shell, the vice-president and general manager of Lenovo's Commercial Desktop Business Unit, this represented a level of processing power previously found only in premium desktops. The desktop was made available in both tower and small form factors.

According to Lenovo, the use of Enhanced Experience 3.0 allowed the desktop to boot in less than 30 seconds. The desktop optionally included AMD Radeon discrete graphics, with support for up to four independent displays. Additional features on the desktop included a hard disk drive of up to 1 TB, eight USB 2.0 ports, a 25-in-1 memory card reader, Trusted Platform Module, and hard disk encryption.

== 2012 ==
=== M82 ===
The M82 is available in Tower or SFF.

Specifications:

- Standard: (Tower)
  - Processor: 2nd Generation Intel Core i3-2120 (3.3 GHz)
  - Operating System: Windows 7 Professional (64-bit)
  - RAM: 4 GB DDR3 Memory
  - Storage: 1x500 GB 7200 RPM SATA
  - Graphics: Integrated Graphics
- Customized with best options: (Tower)
  - Processor: Up to 3rd generation Intel Core i7-3770 (3.4 GHz clock, 3.9 Turbo)
  - Operating system: Windows 7 Professional (64-bit)
  - RAM: Up to 8 GB DDR3 Memory
  - Storage: Up to 2x1 TB 7200 RPM SATA (Tower)
  - Graphics: Up to AMD Radeon HD 7450

== 2013 ==
=== M92/M92p ===
The M92p is a desktop computer designed for business use. Like other computers of the M series, it exists in three form factors: tower, small form factor (SFF) and tiny. The M92p uses Intel Core i3, i5 or i7 processors and makes use of DDR3-1600 RAM. Graphics processing is done by an integrated Intel HD Graphics 2000 GPU. The M92p is available with both hard drives and solid-state storage. One difference with the M91p is that the M92p comes with four USB 3.0 ports on the rear of the computer, whilst the M91p only offers USB 2.0 ports.

In a review for ZDNet, Charles McLellan wrote, "Unless internal expansion is required, we can find little wrong with Lenovo's ThinkCentre M92p as a business-class small-form-factor PC (and there are bigger models in the range if expansion is required). Our review unit was only a moderate performer, but alternative configurations are available to give it more muscle if required."

Specifications (tower):

- Processor:
  - Intel Core i7-3770
  - Intel Core i5-3470/3550/3570
  - Intel Core i3-2120/2130
- Operating System:
  - Windows 7 Professional (64-bit)
  - Windows 8 Pro
- RAM: Up to 32 GB DDR3
- Storage: Up to 128 GB SSD or 2x1 TB 7200 RPM HDD
- Graphics: AMD Radeon HD7350/HD7450

=== M93/M93p ===
The M93/M93p available in Tower Form Factor, Small Form Factor (SFF), and Tiny Form Factor.

Specifications (tower):

- Processor:
  - Intel Core i7-4770/4790
  - Intel Core i5-4430/4440S/4570/4670
  - Intel Core i3-4130/4330
  - Intel Pentium Dual Core G3220/G3420/G3430
  - Intel Celeron G1820/G1830
- Operating System:
  - Windows 7 (Home Basic/Home Premium/Professional/Ultimate)
  - Windows 8.1/Windows 8.1 Pro
- RAM: Up to 32 GB DDR3 (4 x 8 GB)
- Storage: Up to 180 GB SSD or 2 TB 7200 RPM HDD
- Graphics:
  - Intel Integrated
  - ATI Radeon HD8470
  - NVIDIA GeForce GT620/GT630

=== M83 ===
The M83 is available in Mini Tower Form Factor, Small Form Factor, or Tiny Form Factor.

Specifications (mini tower):

- Processor:
  - Intel Core i7-4770
  - Intel Core i5-4570/4670
  - Intel Core i3-4130/4330
- Operating System:
  - Windows 7 Professional 64
  - Windows 8.1 64/Windows 8.1 Pro 64
- RAM: Up to 32 GB DDR3
- Storage: Up to 180 GB SSD or 2 TB 7200 RPM HDD
- Graphics:
  - Intel Integrated
  - ATI Radeon HD8470/HD8570
  - NVIDIA GeForce GT620

== 2016 ==
=== M900/M900x ===
The M900 series was announced in December, 2015 and released in January 2016. The M900 series is available in Tower Form Factor, Small Form Factor, or Tiny Form Factor. The M900x was only available in Tiny Form Factor.

Specifications (tower):

- Processor:
  - Intel Core i7-6700
  - Intel Core i5-6400/6500
  - Intel Core i3-6100
- Operating System:
  - Windows 7 Professional
  - Windows 10 (Home/Pro)
- RAM: Up to 32 GB DDR4
- Storage: Up to 512 GB SSD or 2 TB 7200 RPM HDD
- Graphics:
  - Intel HD Graphics 530
  - NVIDIA Geforce GT 720 (1 GB/2 GB)
  - NVIDIA Quadro K420 2 GB

=== M700 series ===
Model	Revision	Type	Release date	CPU	GPU	Memory	Storage	IO	OS
M700	M700	Tower	January 2016	Intel core 6th gen			2x 3.5" Sata		Windows 7 Professional; Windows 10 Pro
M700	M700	Small	January 2016			Up to 2x16 GB DDR4 2133Mhz			Windows 7 Professional; Windows 10 Pro
M700	M700	Tiny	January 2016	Intel core 6th gen 35W	Intel HD Graphics 510/530	Up to 2x16 GB DDR4 2133Mhz	1x 2.5" Sata; 1x M.2 Sata	x6 USB 3.0; x2 Displayport; 1 optional HDMI, VGA, 3rd Displayport, or DE9 COM port	Windows 7 Professional; Windows 10 Pro

== 2017 ==
The M710 series was released in 2017.

=== M710 series ===
Model	Revision	Type	Release date	CPU	GPU	Memory	Storage	IO	OS
M710	M710t	Tower	February 2017	Intel core 6/7th gen		Up to 4x16 GB DDR4 2400Mhz	2x 3.5" Sata; 1x M.2 NVMe		Windows 7 Professional; Windows 10 Pro
M710	M710s	Small	February 2017						Windows 7 Professional; Windows 10 Pro
M710	M710q	Tiny	February 2017	Intel core 6/7th gen 35W; Intel core 7th gen 35W	Intel HD Graphics 510/530; Intel HD Graphics 610/630	Up to 2x16 GB DDR4 2400Mhz SO-DIMM	1x 2.5" Sata; 1x M.2 NVMe	x6 USB 3.1; 2 Displayport	Windows 7 Professional; Windows 10 Pro

=== M715 series ===
Model	Revision	Type	Release date	CPU	GPU	Memory	Storage	IO	OS
M715	M715t	Tower	June 2017	AMD A6, A10 or A12 APUs; AMD Ryzen 1st gen		Up to 4x16 GB DDR4 2400Mhz SO-DIMM			Windows 7 Professional; Windows 10 Pro
M715	M715s	Small	June 2017						
M715	M715q	Tiny	June 2017	AMD A6, A10 or A12 APUs		Up to 2x16 GB DDR4 2666Mhz SO-DIMM	1x 2.5" Sata; 1x M.2 NVMe		
M715	M715q gen 2	Tiny	July 2018	AMD A6, A10 or A12 APUs; AMD Ryzen 2nd gen APU		Up to 2x16 GB DDR4 2666Mhz SO-DIMM	1x 2.5" Sata; 1x M.2 NVMe		Windows 10 Pro

== 2018 ==
=== M720 series ===
The M720 series was announced in 2018.

Model	Type	CPU	GPU	Memory	Storage	IO
M720	Tower	Intel core 8th gen 65W; Intel core 9th gen 65W	Intel UHD Graphics 610/630; AMD Radeon RX 550X	Up to 4x16 GB DDR4 2666Mhz SO-DIMM	1x 2.5" Sata; 1x 3.5" Sata; 1x M.2 NVMe	x7 USB 3 gen 1; x2 USB 3 gen 2; 2 Displayport
M720q	Tiny	Intel core 8th gen 35W; Intel core 9th gen 35W	Intel UHD Graphics 610/630	Up to 2x16 GB DDR4 2666Mhz SO-DIMM	1x 2.5" Sata; 1x M.2 NVMe	x4 USB 3 gen 1; x2 USB 3 gen 2; 1 Displayport; 2 HDMI

=== M920 series ===
Model	Type	CPU	GPU	Memory	Storage	IO
M920	Tower	Intel core 8th gen 65W; Intel core 9th gen 65W	Intel UHD Graphics 610/630; Nvidia GTX 1060	Up to 4x16 GB DDR4 2666Mhz SO-DIMM	1x 2.5" Sata; 1x 3.5" Sata; 1x M.2 NVMe	x7 USB 3 gen 1; x2 USB 3 gen 2; 2 Displayport
M920q	Tiny	Intel core 8th gen 35W; Intel core 9th gen 35W	Intel UHD Graphics 610/630	Up to 2x16 GB DDR4 2666Mhz SO-DIMM	1x 2.5" Sata; 1x M.2 NVMe	x4 USB 3 gen 1; x2 USB 3 gen 2; 1 Displayport; 2 HDMI

== Product Specifications Reference (historical entries) ==
2021

Nano Desktops

- ThinkCentre M75n
- ThinkCentre M75n IoT
- ThinkCentre M75n Thin Client
- ThinkCentre M90n-1 Nano
- ThinkCentre M90n-1 Nano IoT

Tiny Desktops

- ThinkCentre M60e
- ThinkCentre M625 Tiny Thin Client
- ThinkCentre M630e Tiny
- ThinkCentre M70q
- ThinkCentre M70q Gen 2
- ThinkCentre M720 Tiny
- ThinkCentre M75q Gen 2
- ThinkCentre M75q Tiny
- ThinkCentre M80q
- ThinkCentre M90q
- ThinkCentre M90q Gen 2
- ThinkCentre M920 Tiny
- ThinkSmart Edition Tiny M80q
- ThinkSmart Edition Tiny M920q for Logitech
- ThinkSmart Edition Tiny M920q for Poly
- ThinkSmart Edition Tiny M920q for Zoom Rooms

SFF Desktops

- ThinkCentre M70s
- ThinkCentre M70c
- ThinkCentre M720 SFF
- ThinkCentre M75s Gen 2
- ThinkCentre M80s
- ThinkCentre M90s
- ThinkCentre M920 SFF

Tower Desktops

- ThinkCentre M70t
- ThinkCentre M720 Tower
- ThinkCentre M75t Gen 2
- ThinkCentre M80t
- ThinkCentre M90t
- ThinkCentre M920 Tower

2020

Nano Desktops

- ThinkCentre M75n
- ThinkCentre M75n IoT
- ThinkCentre M75n Thin Client
- ThinkCentre M90n-1 Nano
- ThinkCentre M90n-1 Nano IoT

Tiny Desktops

- ThinkCentre M70q
- ThinkCentre M80q
- ThinkCentre M625 Tiny
- ThinkCentre M625 Tiny Thin Client
- ThinkCentre M630e Tiny
- ThinkCentre M715 Tiny (2nd Gen)
- ThinkCentre M715 Tiny Thin Client (2nd Gen)
- ThinkCentre M720 Tiny
- ThinkCentre M75q Gen 2
- ThinkCentre M75q Tiny
- ThinkCentre M90q
- ThinkCentre M920 Tiny
- ThinkCentre M920x Tiny
- ThinkSmart Edition Tiny M920q for Logitech
- ThinkSmart Edition Tiny M920q for Poly
- ThinkSmart Edition Tiny M920q for Zoom Rooms

SFF Desktops

- ThinkCentre M70s
- ThinkCentre M70c
- ThinkCentre M720 SFF
- ThinkCentre M720e SFF
- ThinkCentre M725 SFF
- ThinkCentre M75s
- ThinkCentre M75s Gen 2
- ThinkCentre M80s
- ThinkCentre M90s
- ThinkCentre M920 SFF

Tower Desktops

- ThinkCentre M70t
- ThinkCentre M720 Tower
- ThinkCentre M75t Gen 2
- ThinkCentre M80t
- ThinkCentre M90t
- ThinkCentre M920 Tower

2019

Nano Desktops

- ThinkCentre M90n-1 Nano
- ThinkCentre M90n-1 Nano IoT

Tiny Desktops

- ThinkCentre M600 Tiny
- ThinkCentre M600 Tiny Thin Client
- ThinkCentre M625 Tiny
- ThinkCentre M625 Tiny Thin Client
- ThinkCentre M630e Tiny
- ThinkCentre M710 Tiny
- ThinkCentre M715 Tiny (2nd Gen)
- ThinkCentre M715 Tiny Thin Client
- ThinkCentre M715 Tiny Thin Client (2nd Gen)
- ThinkCentre M720 Tiny
- ThinkCentre M75q Tiny
- ThinkCentre M910 Tiny
- ThinkCentre M920 Tiny
- ThinkCentre M920x Tiny

SFF Desktops

- ThinkCentre M710 SFF
- ThinkCentre M710e SFF
- ThinkCentre M715 SFF
- ThinkCentre M720 SFF
- ThinkCentre M720e SFF
- ThinkCentre M725 SFF
- ThinkCentre M75s SFF
- ThinkCentre M910 SFF
- ThinkCentre M920 SFF

Tower Desktops

- ThinkCentre M710 Tower
- ThinkCentre M715 Tower
- ThinkCentre M720 Tower
- ThinkCentre M910 Tower
- ThinkCentre M920 Tower

2018

- ThinkCentre M600 Tiny
- ThinkCentre M600 Tiny Thin Client
- ThinkCentre M625 Tiny
- ThinkCentre M625 Tiny Thin Client
- ThinkCentre M710 SFF
- ThinkCentre M710 Tiny
- ThinkCentre M710 Tower
- ThinkCentre M710e SFF
- ThinkCentre M715 SFF
- ThinkCentre M715 Tiny
- ThinkCentre M715 Tiny (2nd Gen)
- ThinkCentre M715 Tiny Thin Client
- ThinkCentre M715 Tiny Thin Client (2nd Gen)
- ThinkCentre M715 Tower
- ThinkCentre M720 SFF
- ThinkCentre M720 Tiny
- ThinkCentre M720 Tower
- ThinkCentre M725 SFF
- ThinkCentre M910 SFF
- ThinkCentre M910 Tiny
- ThinkCentre M910 Tower
- ThinkCentre M910x Tiny
- ThinkCentre M920 SFF
- ThinkCentre M920 Tiny
- ThinkCentre M920 Tower
- ThinkCentre M920x Tiny

2017

- ThinkCentre M600 Tiny
- ThinkCentre M600 Tiny Thin Client
- ThinkCentre M710 SFF
- ThinkCentre M710 Tiny
- ThinkCentre M710 Tower
- ThinkCentre M715 SFF
- ThinkCentre M715 Tiny
- ThinkCentre M715 Tiny Thin Client
- ThinkCentre M715 Tower
- ThinkCentre M910 SFF
- ThinkCentre M910 Tiny
- ThinkCentre M910 Tower
- ThinkCentre M910x Tiny

2016

- ThinkCentre M600 Tiny
- ThinkCentre M700 SFF
- ThinkCentre M700 Tiny
- ThinkCentre M700 Tower
- ThinkCentre M715 Tiny
- ThinkCentre M79 SFF
- ThinkCentre M79 Tower
- ThinkCentre M800 SFF
- ThinkCentre M800 Tower
- ThinkCentre M900 SFF
- ThinkCentre M900 Tiny
- ThinkCentre M900 Tower
- ThinkCentre M900x Tiny

2015

- ThinkCentre M32 Thin Client
- ThinkCentre M53 Tiny
- ThinkCentre M600 Tiny
- ThinkCentre M73 SFF
- ThinkCentre M73 Tiny
- ThinkCentre M73 Tower
- ThinkCentre M73p Tower
- ThinkCentre M79 SFF
- ThinkCentre M79 Tower
- ThinkCentre M800 SFF Pro
- ThinkCentre M800 Tower
- ThinkCentre M83 SFF Pro
- ThinkCentre M83 Tiny
- ThinkCentre M83 Tower
- ThinkCentre M900 SFF Pro
- ThinkCentre M900 Tiny
- ThinkCentre M900 Tower
- ThinkCentre M93 M93p Tiny
- ThinkCentre M93 M93p Tower
- ThinkCentre M93p SFF Pro

2014

- ThinkCentre M32 Thin Client
- ThinkCentre M53 Tiny
- ThinkCentre M73 SFF
- ThinkCentre M73 Tiny
- ThinkCentre M73 Tower
- ThinkCentre M79 SFF
- ThinkCentre M79 Tower
- ThinkCentre M83 SFF Pro
- ThinkCentre M83 Tiny
- ThinkCentre M83 Tower
- ThinkCentre M93 M93p Tiny
- ThinkCentre M93 M93p Tower
- ThinkCentre M93p SFF Pro
