= Izhar Bar-Gad =

Israeli neurophysiologist

- יזהר בר-גד
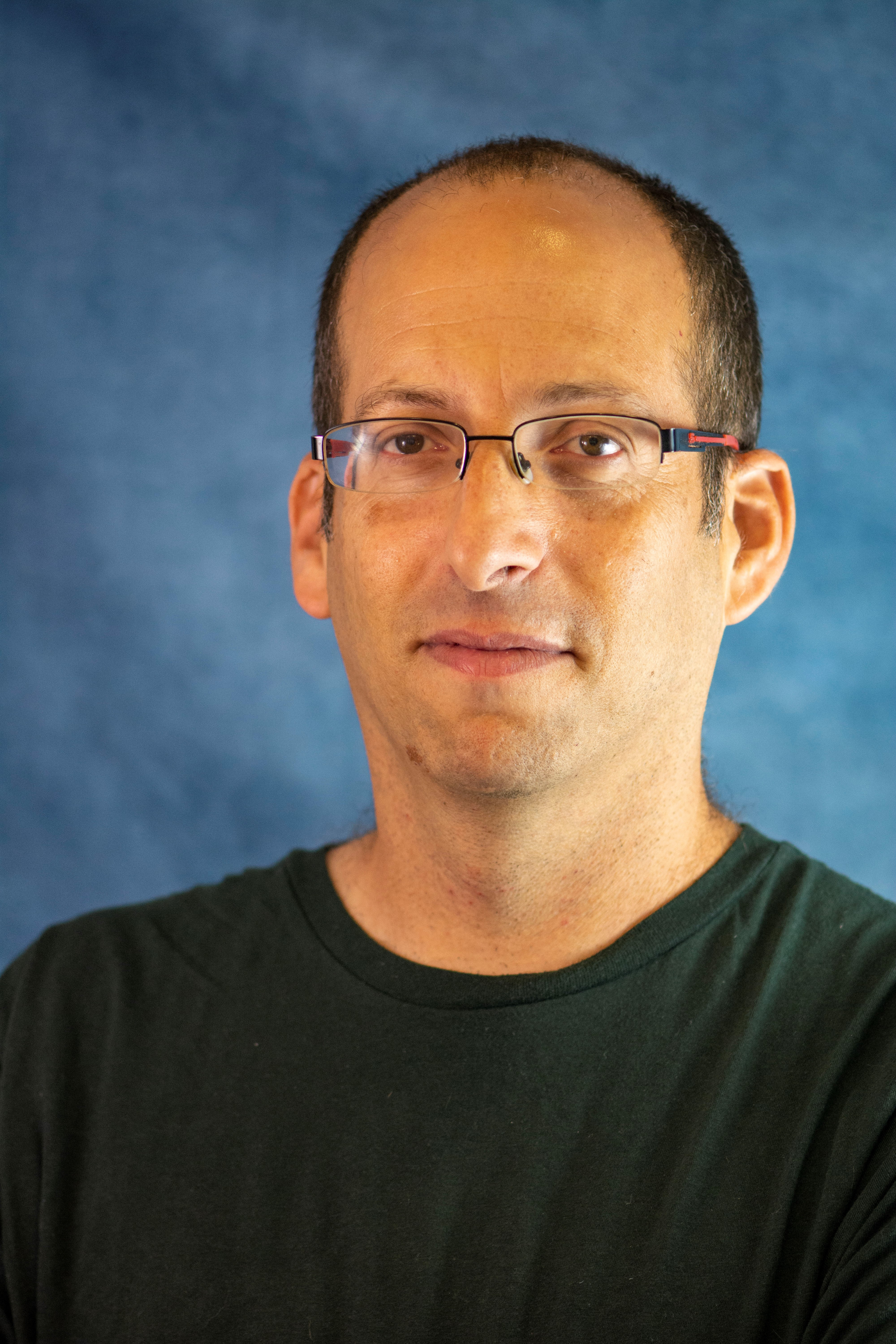
- Izhar Bar-Gad
- Born: Rehovot , Israel
- Citizenship: Israeli
- Education: Tel Aviv University, Hebrew University; Bar-Ilan University
- Website: gondabrain.biu.ac.il/en/node/250

Izhar Bar-Gad (Hebrew: יזהר בר-גד) is a full professor at the Leslie and Susan Gonda Brain Research Center at Bar-Ilan University. Bar-Gad is a researcher in the field of neurophysiology and neural computation. His main areas of research are information processing in the basal ganglia in a normal state and in various pathologies, such as Parkinson's disease and Tourette's syndrome.

== Education ==
In 2003, he completed a Ph.D. at the Hebrew University in neural computation, under the guidance of Prof. Hagai Bergman and Prof. Yaakov Ritov. His doctoral dissertation was written on the subject of "Reinforcement driven dimensionality reduction as a model for information processing in the basal ganglia".

== Early life ==
Born in Rehovot and raised in Pretoria, South Africa and Qiryat Gat, Israel. Enlistment in the Israel Defense Forces in 1989 in the Israeli Intelligence Corps, discharge in 1994 with the rank of Captain.

== Career ==
In the years 1994–1997, he worked for Amdocs, as a researcher and project manager in the development of distributed artificial intelligence. From 1997 to 2002, he worked for Sanctum in Israel and later in California as the Chief Technology Officer (CTO).

In 2005, he was appointed a lecturer at the Center for Brain Research at Bar-Ilan University. In the years 2008–2011 he served as head of the Department of Neuroscience. In 2010 he was appointed a senior lecturer. In 2012 he was appointed associate professor and since 2018 he has been a full professor at Bar-Ilan University.

Izhar Bar-Gad researches information processing in the basal ganglia in the normal condition and in various pathological conditions. His research combines experimental methods in the fields of systems neurophysiology with computational methods from the fields of data science and neural computation.

His early research was mainly concerned with changes in brain computation that occur during Parkinson's disease and its treatments, drug therapies and deep brain stimulation (DBS). His later research deals with the neurophysiological changes that occur in neurodevelopmental disorders, such as Tourette's Syndrome and Attention Deficit Hyperactivity Disorder (ADHD).
