= ThinkCentre A series =

Series of Desktop PC's from Lenovo

The A Series desktops are part of Lenovo’s ThinkCentre product line. The first desktop in the A Series was the ThinkCentre A50p. Lenovo has released A Series desktops in multiple form factors, ranging from traditional tower, to small form factor, and all-in-ones (AIOs). Formerly an IBM brand, Lenovo acquired the ThinkCentre desktop brand following its purchase of IBM's Personal Computing Division (PCD) in 2005.

== 2010 ==
=== A70 ===
The A70 was released by Lenovo in 2010 with the following specifications:

- Processor: 2.93 GHz Intel Core 2 Duo E7500
- RAM: Up to 4 GB 1066 MHz DDR3 SDRAM
- Storage: Up to 500 GB
- Optical Drive: DVD reader/writer
- Graphics: Intel Graphics Media Accelerator X4500
- Form Factor: Small form factor

=== A70z ===
The ThinkCentre A70z was an all-in-one computer (AIO) released by Lenovo in 2010. The AIO offered the following specifications:

- Processor: 2.93 GHz Intel Core 2 Duo E7500
- RAM: 2GB
- Graphics: Intel Graphics Media Accelerator X4500
- Operating System: Microsoft Windows 7 Professional (32-bit)

Engadget reported that the A70z was easy to set up and offered a 35-second boot time, in-line with Lenovo's claims. The A70z was capable of handling high-definition video and running Adobe Photoshop with ease, making it suitable for everyday business use. However, the presence of the integrated graphics card prevented 3D gaming on the desktop.

The ThinkCentre A70z received positive reviews from Inc., Desktop Review, and Hardware Central. Inc. ranked the ThinkCentre A70z third on its list of ‘Best New Business Desktops’. Desktop Review listed the A70z desktop on its list of ‘Top 10 Desktops for Back to School’. Hardware Central awarded the desktop 12 out of 15 stars, with 4 of 5 stars for features, performance, and value respectively.

=== A58 ===
Announced in March 2010, the ThinkCentre A58 desktop was equipped with the Intel Pentium Dual-Core E5200 processor with a speed of 2.5 GHz, up to a Core 2 quad q9x50. 3 GB 800 MHz DDR2 SDRAM, a 250 GB 7200 RPM SATA hard disk drive up to 1 TB 7200 RPM and an 160 GB 10,000 RPM drive, Integrated HD audio with a built-in mono speaker, Intel GMA 4500 integrated graphics, Microsoft Windows Vista Business, 6 USB 2.0 ports, 2 PS/2 inputs, and 2 headphone and microphone audio jacks with line out. Desktop Review listed the pros of the desktop as being the build quality, legacy ports, and power saving software. The cons were listed as wasted internal space, the absence of card readers, and the limited port selection.

== 2007 ==
=== A55 ===
PC World indicated that the ThinkCentre A55 small form factor desktop, announced in January 2007, was a “pure business PC.". The desktop incorporated a mid-range processor, the Intel E6300 Core 2 Duo with a speed of 1.83 GHz, and offered a maximum of 4 GB of DDR2 667 MHz RAM on 2 DIMM slots. PC World noted that the desktop scored 89 on its World Bench 5 test, indicating that it could run most software packages available at the time with ease.

=== A61e ===
The ThinkCentre A61e desktop was announced in September 2007 and was called “the company's smallest, quietest and most energy-efficient desktop yet”. The A61e was equipped with an AMD Athlon X2 BE-2350 processor with a speed of 2.1 GHz, 2GB RAM, a 180GB hard disk drive, the ATI Radeon X1200 graphics card, and Microsoft Windows Vista Business.

PC Mag listed the pros of the desktop as its compact size, energy efficiency, processor, quiet operation, affordable price, ThinkVantage utilities, case design, and light weight. The cons were listed as being the slightly reduced performance compared to other business systems, the lack of internal expansion for PCI/PCIe slots, notebook-class RAM, and external power supply.

== 2006 ==
=== A60 ===
The ThinkCentre A60 desktop was announced in August 2006 by Lenovo following the company’s acquisition of IBM’s Personal Computing Division in 2005.

It was categorized a mid-range desktop by PCMag. The desktop was praised for its useful utilities, a toolless chassis designed for upgrades, Athlon X2 dual core processor, spacious hard disk drive and the fact that it still had a floppy disk drive. The cons were that the desktop had shared video memory despite the use of Windows Vista and that it was slower than desktops with Intel Core 2 Duo processors.

=== A53 ===
The ThinkCentre A53 and A55 desktops were announced in September 2006 by Lenovo. The A53 desktop featured an Intel Pentium D 945 3.4 GHz dual core processor, SiS662 chipset, up to 2 GB DDR2 Non-ECC SDRAM, an 80 GB SATA-300 7200 RPM hard disk drive, an integrated High Definition Audio sound card, and built-in speakers.

=== A55 ===
The ThinkCentre A55 desktop was equipped with an Intel Pentium 4 541 Processor, 512 MB PC2-4200 DDR2 Memory, an 80 GB 7200 RPM SATA Hard Drive, 48x CD-RW/DVD Combo Drive, Intel GMA 3000 Integrated Graphics with 128MB Shared Memory, Integrated AC'97 Audio, and six USB 2.0 Ports. Both processor and storage were criticized by About.com, with software bundle being complimented.

== Launch in 2003 ==
=== A50p ===
The first ThinkCentre A Series desktop was the A50p. It was designed as a business machine, as observed in a review by About.com. This was because of the storage space on the desktop, which was limited to 40 GB – sufficient for business documents and applications, but not for images and video. The A50p had an Intel Pentium 4 2.8 GHz Processor, 256 MB PC2700 DDR Memory, 40 GB 7,200 RPM Hard Drive, 48x CD-ROM Optical Drive, SoundMAX Cadenza (AC'97) Audio, Intel Extreme 2 Integrated Graphics with 64 MB of Shared Memory, a 10/100 Ethernet Port, and six USB 2.0 Ports.

The A50p was called a "high-end consumer PC" by PC Magazine. The machine was indicated to be a capable home-office machine to which multimedia applications could be added. The specifications of the A50p desktop were: Intel Pentium 4 processor, 1 GB RAM, 120 GB hard disk drive, and a 17 inch LCD screen.
