= ThinkCentre Edge =

Series of desktop computers made by Lenovo

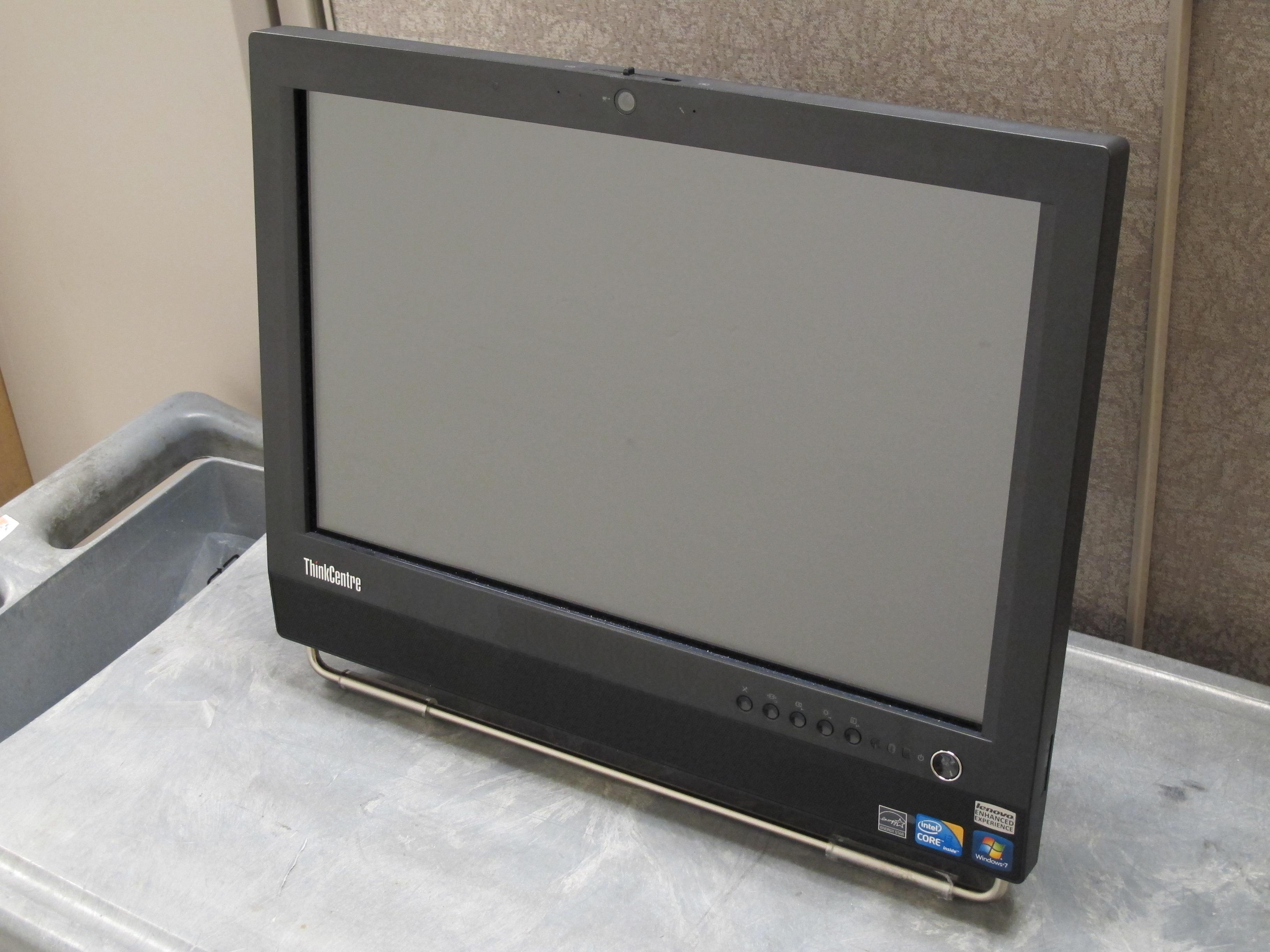
ThinkCentre Edge all-in-one (AIO) PC

The ThinkCentre Edge is a series of desktop computers from Lenovo, designed primarily for home offices and small businesses. The product series features desktops in both tower and All-in-One form factors, designed to save up to 70% desk space as compared to traditional tower desktop PCs.

The ThinkCentre Edge desktop series represents the first time the 'Edge' brand has been used for any Lenovo product outside of the ThinkPad product line. The first desktop in the series was the Edge 91z AIO, announced on May 16, 2011.

== Design ==
According to Paul Scaini, the Segment Manager for the ThinkCentre product line, the ThinkCentre Edge desktops were the result of a large amount of time spent on refining the overall product appearance. The Edge 91z was described in the article as being the epitome of that effort, with its Infinity Glass design.

Scaini wrote that the Edge AIO desktops had the same serviceability and mounting features as the ThinkCentre M Series AIOs. They used second-generation Intel Core i desktop CPUs and Lenovo Enhanced Experience 2.0.

== 2014 ==
=== ThinkCentre Edge 73 ===
- Up to 4th generation Intel Core i7 processor
- Windows 8 (64-bit)
  - Upgradeable to Windows 10
- Up to 2 TB HDD / Up to 128 GB SSD
- Up to 16 GB memory

== 2013 ==
=== ThinkCentre Edge 72 ===
- Up to 3rd generation Intel Core i7 or i3 processor
- Windows 7 (64-bit)
  - Upgradeable to Windows 10
- Up to 2 TB HDD / Up to 128 GB SSD
- Up to 16 GB memory

== 2011 ==
Four desktops in the ThinkCentre Edge series were launched in 2011. These were:

- ThinkCentre Edge 91z (AIO)
- ThinkCentre Edge 91 (tower)
- ThinkCentre Edge 71z (AIO)
- ThinkCentre Edge 71 (tower)

=== ThinkCentre Edge 91z ===
The ThinkCentre Edge 91z AIO was summarized by PCMag as being a reasonably priced, powerful desktop with the capacity to "give the iMac a run for its place in a design studio." The Edge 91z was 2.5 inches thick, and was described as being "less flashy" than the IdeaCentre desktops and AIOs.

The Edge 91z was described as being simple with a seamless front and two removable feet that could be detached from the AIO. The space between the two feet was open and meant to store a keyboard. This was described as being different from the IdeaCentre B520 desktop, in which the keyboard storage was blocked by the speaker bar.

The display on offer with the Edge 91z AIO was a true 1080p HD. A drawback of the screen was the reflective glass front panel.

An optional DVD writer was available on the Edge 91z AIO. The AIO was reported by PCMag to be lacking in "would be nice features" such as eSATA ports, USB 3.0 ports, and HDMI-in.

The software on the Edge 91z AIO was reported to be a useful set, with the system free of unnecessary software. Software preinstalled on the AIO included Lenovo Rescue and Recovery and utilities for the DVD burner and the web camera.

In comparison with the Apple iMac 21.5 inch (Thunderbolt) the ThinkCentre Edge 91z was reported to be similar in terms of performance and specifications. The iMac was described as being slightly faster on 3D-related and everyday tasks, while the ThinkCentre Edge 91z was slightly faster on multimedia benchmarks. Both desktops contained similarly sized widescreens, AMD graphics, Intel Core processors, 1 TB storage space, and could be used as external monitors for laptops.

Detailed specifications of the Edge 91z AIO are:

- Processor: up to Intel Core i7-2600S (2.8 GHz, 8MB L3 cache)
- Chipset: Intel B65
- Display: 21.5-inch LED 16:9 widescreen
- Operating system: Windows 7 Professional/Ultimate
- Storage:
  - Up to 1 TB 7,200 rpm SATA
  - Up to 80GB mSATA (solid state drive)
- Graphics:
  - Intel HD Graphics
  - AMD Radeon HD6650A
- RAM: Up to 8 GB PC3-10600 1333 MHz
- Dimensions (W x D x H): 21.46in x 16.31in x 3.18in
- Weight: 8.5 kg
- Additional features: VGA, Microphone, Gigabit Ethernet, Bluetooth, 6 USB ports, 2 SATA connectors, Kensington lock

The ThinkCentre Edge 91z had preloaded ThinkVantage Technologies software, including Rescue and Recovery, Power Manager, and System Update.

=== ThinkCentre Edge 91 ===
The ThinkCentre Edge 91 desktop was announced on October 20, 2011, by Lenovo. Unlike the Edge 91z, this desktop was not an AIO, but a traditional tower desktop in a small form factor. The Edge 91 desktop was described as being a desktop designed for a "premium computing experience".

Detailed specifications of the Edge 91 desktop are as follows:

- Processor: Up to Intel Core i7-2400 (3.4 GHz, 8MB cache)
- Chipset: Intel B65
- RAM: Up to 16 GB PC3-10600 1333 MHz DDR3
- Audio: Integrated
- Operating System:
  - Windows 7 Home Basic/Home Premium/Professional (in 32bit and 64bit variants)
  - DOS
  - Linux - Redhat, Novell, SUSE, Ubuntu
- Storage:
  - Up to 1TB 7,200 rpm/10,000 rpm SATA
  - Up to 160 GB SSD
- Graphics:
  - Integrated
  - ATI Radeon HD5450
  - ATI Radeon HD6450

=== ThinkCentre Edge 71z ===
The ThinkCentre Edge 71z AIO was announced on October 20, 2011, by Lenovo. Technology News described the Edge 71z as having a "glossy black shell" and an "impressive appearance". The AIO offered a 20 inch display, up to Intel Core i5 processors, up to 1TB hard disk drives or a 160GB solid state drive, an optional Display Port and support for dual independent display.

As with the Edge 91z, the ThinkCentre Edge 71z AIO offered a suite of ThinkVantage Technologies including Rescue and Recovery, Power Manager, and System Update.

Detailed specifications of the Edge 71z are as follows:

- Processor: Up to Intel Core i5-2500S (2.7 GHz)
- Chipset: Intel H61
- RAM: Up to 8 GB PC3-10600 1333 MHz DDR3
- Audio: Integrated
- Operating System:
  - Windows 7 Home Basic/Home Premium/Professional
  - DOS
  - Linux - RedHat, Novel SUSE, Ubuntu
- Storage: Up to 1 TB 7,200 rpm SATA
- Graphics:
  - ATI Onega integrated graphics
  - Optional 1 GB discrete graphics

=== ThinkCentre Edge 71 ===
The ThinkCentre Edge 71 desktop, like the Edge 91, was a tower desktop available in a small form factor. It was announced with the Edge 91 and Edge 71z on October 20, 2011.

Detailed specifications of the Edge 71 desktop are as follows:

- Processor: Up to Intel Core i5-2390T (2.7 GHz, 3 MB cache)
- Chipset: Intel H61
- RAM: Up to 8 GB PC3-10600 1333 MHz DDR3
- Audio: Integrated
- Operating System: up to Windows 7 Professional
- Graphics:
  - Intel HD Graphics 2000
  - ATI Radeon HD5450
  - ATI Radeon HD 6450
