= Datacap =

IBM software company

Datacap Inc. - An IBM Company
- Type: Private
- Industry: Computer software
- Founded: 1988 Datacap Inc.
- Founder: Scott Blau, Noel Kropf
- Headquarters: Tarrytown, New York United States
- Key people: Scott Blau: CEO, Noel Kropf: CTO
- Products: Document capture and Process Automation
- Number of employees: 55 (2009)

Datacap (an IBM Company), a privately owned company, manufactures and sells computer software, and services. Datacap's first product, Paper Keyboard, was a "forms processing" product and shipped in 1989. In August 2010, IBM announced that it had acquired Datacap for an undisclosed amount.

== Overview ==
Datacap sells products through a value-added distribution network worldwide. The software is classified as "enterprise software", meaning that it requires trained professionals to install and configure. Although the Company has focused on providing solutions for scanning paper documents, most recently Company materials have emphasized customer requirements to handle electronic documents ("eDocs"), documents being received into an organization electronically (usually email).

Datacap claims that its software is unique because of the rules engine ("Rulerunner") used for processing inbound documents, including performing the image processing (deskew, noise removal, etc.), optical character recognition (OCR), intelligent character recognition (ICR), validations, and export-release formatting of extracted data to target ERP and line of business application.

== See also ==
- List of mergers and acquisitions by IBM
