= NLayers =

Company specializing in network detection products

nLayers Inc.
- Company type: Private Company
- Industry: Information Technology
- Founded: 2003
- Founder: Gili Raanan
- Defunct: 2006
- Fate: Acquired
- Successor: EMC Corporation
- Headquarters: Cupertino, California, United States
- Number of locations: Cupertino, California and Herzliya, Israel
- Products: network service discovery software
- Website: www.nlayers.com

nLayers was an American/Israeli software company specializing in network discovery products; software designed to map the entirety of hosts, services, etc. that run on a given organization's network. Its primary product was "nLayers InSight". The company was acquired in 2006 by EMC Corporation.

== History ==
nLayers was founded by Gili Raanan, in 2003 and was headquartered in Cupertino, California with a research and development center in Herzliya, Israel. Initial funding was provided by Venture capital funds Gemini Israel Funds and Walden Israel.

Following its acquisition on June 7, 2006, nLayers became a subsidiary of EMC. It was later merged into Vmware. In June 2013 Vmware announced that end of life date for the original nLayers product would be March 8, 2017.

== See also ==
- EMC Corporation
- Silicon Wadi
