= Sanctum Inc. =

American information technology company

- Type: Private company
- Industry: Software and information technology
- Predecessor: Perfecto Technologies
- Founded: 1997
- Founder: Gili Raanan and Eran Reshef
- Defunct: 2006
- Fate: Acquired by IBM
- Headquarters: Herzliya, Israel, Santa Clara, California;
- Products: AppShield and AppScan
- Website: www.sanctuminc.com (archived)

Sanctum Inc. was a Santa Clara, California-based information technology company focused on application security. Sanctum offered a firewall, AppShield, and scanner, AppScan, for application-layer security for Web environments.

In 2004 Sanctum was merged with Watchfire and the company was subsequently acquired by IBM.

== History ==
Sanctum was founded in 1997 as Perfecto Technologies, by Eran Reshef and Gili Raanan.

The company released its first product AppShield in summer of 1999.

The company has done an extensive research in application security and applying formal methods to real life software in collaboration with Turing Award winner Professor Amir Penueli. Early research in 1996 and 1997 led to the invention, in parallel to other teams, of CAPTCHA technology, and the application for a US patent for CAPTCHA.

In 2000 the company renamed itself to Sanctum. The company was backed by investors Sequoia Capital, Intel Capital, Goldman Sachs, DLJ, Walden and Mofet.

In 2004, Watchfire acquired Sanctum for an undisclosed amount. In 2007, Watchfire was acquired by IBM.

== Products ==
The AppShield product was an early Web application Firewall. AppShield was conceptualized by Eran Reshef and Gili Raanan and was introduced to the market in 1999. AppShield worked by inspecting incoming HTTP requests and blocking malicious attacks based on a dynamic policy which was composed by analyzing the outgoing HTML pages. A 2002 ZDNet article noted that in the three years following its launch, it had been used by 60 Fortune 100 companies. Watchfire acquired Sanctum in 2004, and subsequently sold the intellectual property for AppShield to F5 Networks, which discontinued the product in favor of its competing TrafficShield product.

In June 2000 the company introduced AppScan the world's first Web Security Vulnerability Assessment solution. Among the first clients for AppScan were Yahoo!, Bank of America and AT&T.
