= Blade Network Technologies =

Networking hardware company (2006–2011)

BLADE Network Technologies
- Industry: Network hardware
- Founded: 2006
- Headquarters: Santa Clara, California, US
- Key people: Vikram Mehta, Vice President, System Networking, IBM Systems and Technology Group
- Parent: Lenovo

BLADE Network Technologies, based in Santa Clara, California, was a supplier of Ethernet network switches for blade servers and server and storage data center racks.

BLADE was acquired by IBM in 2010, and was renamed "IBM System Networking" in 2011, which was later sold to Lenovo as part of its purchase of IBM's x86 server division

== History ==
On February 13, 2006, Garnett & Helfrich Capital established BLADE Network Technologies, Inc., as a privately held company from a spin-out of Nortel's Blade Server Switch Unit, focused on networking for the blade server market. Vikram Mehta was president and CEO.

In 2008, the company introduced its RackSwitch line of top-of-rack 1-10 Gigabit Ethernet data center switches. IBM acquired BLADE in October 2010, renaming it to "IBM System Networking" in 2011.

Lenovo acquired IBM's server business, including System Networking, in 2014.

== See also ==
- Fibre Channel over Ethernet
- IBM BladeCenter
- List of mergers and acquisitions by IBM
