= DataMirror =

Software company in Canada

- Type: Subsidiary of public company
- Industry: Computer software
- Founded: 1993; 33 years ago
- Headquarters: Markham, Ontario
- Key people: Nigel W. Stokes (Co-founder, Chairman of the Board, CEO)
- Products: Data integration, protection, auditing, and capture
- Revenue: ▲$44.7 million USD (2006)
- Net income: ▼$3.68 million USD (2006)
- Number of employees: 220 (2006)
- Parent: IBM
- Website: www.datamirror.com

DataMirror Corporation, founded in 1993, was a computer software company based in Markham, Ontario, Canada with offices in several countries. The company provides real-time data integration, protection, and Java database products, and in 2006 claimed to have over 2100 business customers in industries including healthcare, retail, telecommunications, and financial services. In 2007, the company was acquired by IBM.

== History ==
- 1993 - DataMirror was founded
- 1996 - DataMirror had its initial public offering
- 1997 - DataMirror acquired SQLPump from SoftQuest Corp.
- 1998 - DataMirror acquired mpc-Software GmbH, a software distributor located in Frankfurt, Germany
- 2000 - DataMirror purchased assets of Constellar Corp, makers of Constellar Hub
- 2001 - DataMirror acquired BDI Systems, Inc. which builds bi-directional, Java-based, data transformation software that exchanges data between XML, relational database and text formats.
- 2003 - DataMirror completed acquisition of PointBase, makers of a Java database
- 2003 - DataMirror acquired assets of bankrupt SmartSales, maker of sales force automation products
- 2004 - DataMirror divested interest in Idion Technology Holdings, of South Africa
- 2007 - On 16 Jul 2007, IBM purchased all of the outstanding DataMirror common shares at a price of C$27.00 per common share payable in cash, amounting to total consideration of approximately C$170 million (approximately US$161 million).
- 2007 - 04 Sept 2007, IBM (NYSE: IBM) announced it had completed its acquisition of DataMirror.
- 2012 - 04 Jan 2012, IBM (NYSE: IBM) announced it had completed its sale of its iCluster software business to Rocket Software, a privately held company based in Waltham, MA. iCluster software was originally acquired by IBM when it acquired DataMirror Corporation in 2007.

== Products ==
- Transformation Server - Real-time bi-directional replication for loading a data warehouse, synchronizing data between existing systems and Web applications, or distributing data between different applications for decision-making
- iCluster - aims to ensure high availability of business applications and provide disaster avoidance and protection for IBM i systems
- LiveAudit - provides an audit trail of data changes aimed at reducing fraud, improving customer service and accountability, ensuring compliance with industry regulations, and managing and protecting data assets
- iReflect - provides a consistent, updated view of information by distributing and consolidating data in real-time between Oracle databases
- Transformation Server/Event Server – detects events as they occur in production applications and creates business information to feed into the message queues of several enterprise application integration (EAI), business process management (BPM) and service-oriented architecture (SOA) environments
- PointBase - a SQL92/99 JDBC-compliant Java relational database.

== See also ==
- List of mergers and acquisitions by IBM
