= Gili Raanan =

Israeli inventor

- גילי רענן
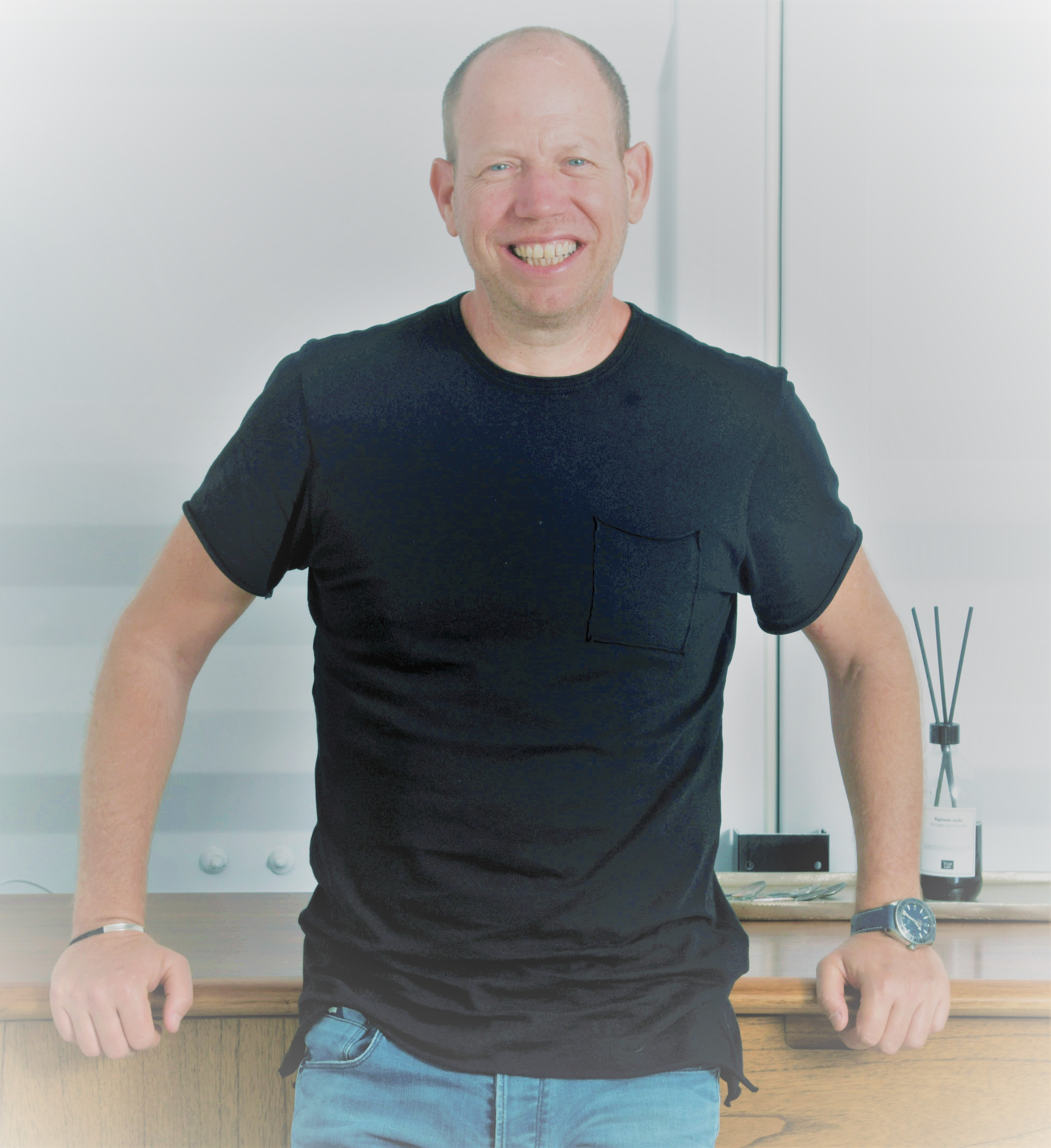
- Born: 1969 (age 56–57); Kfar Saba, Israel
- Occupations: venture capitalist and entrepreneur

Gili Raanan (Hebrew: גילי רענן; born 1969) is an Israeli venture capitalist and former founder of multiple software companies. Raanan started Sanctum in 1997, the company that created the Web application firewall AppShield and the web application penetration testing software AppScan. He later started NLayers which was acquired by EMC Corporation. He was a general partner at Sequoia Capital, the founder of Cyberstarts, and board member at Wiz, Adallom, Onavo, and Moovit, Snaptu.

== Biography ==
Gili Raanan was born in Kfar Saba, Israel. He served in Unit 8200 for ten years. He received IDF Innovation Award (1992) and Israel Defense Presidential Prize (1996).

He earned a bachelor's degree in Computer Science from Tel Aviv University in 2002 and a Master of Business Administration degree from the University's Recanati Graduate School of Business Administration.

== Business career ==
Raanan started Sanctum in 1997, and created AppShield, a web application firewall and AppScan, a web application penetration testing tool.

Raanan later started NLayers in 2003 which was acquired by EMC Corporation pioneering the science of Application discovery and understanding.

=== Venture capitalist ===
In 2009 Raanan joined Sequoia Capital in Israel as a General Partner. In 2018 Raanan founded Cyberstarts, which is an early stage VC focused on Cybersecurity. Raanan was an early investor in Wiz, leading its seed round in 2020. In March 2026, Google completed its $32 billion acquisition of Wiz, which Forbes described as Google's largest acquisition and the largest-ever acquisition of a venture-backed startup

According to Forbes, Raanan was the first investor and mentor to more than 20 cybersecurity companies, including Armis, Island, Cyera, Upwind and Noname Security.

In June 2024 the Israeli business news outlet Calcalist published an investigation into Cyberstarts' business practices, writing that "points worth tens of thousands of dollars are awarded to CISOs of organizations for deepening relationships with the fund's portfolio companies, aiding their growth" and "mutual oral understanding is that the progress in accumulating points also involves purchases." Raanan and the fund responded by saying that "No CISO received compensation for purchasing products."

== Honors ==
In 2026 Raanan was honored as one of the 14 torchbearers in the national Israeli Independence Day ceremony. In 2026, Forbes ranked Raanan fourth on its Midas List and first on its Midas Seed List. Forbes credited his ranking in part to his 2020 seed investment in Wiz.
