= Holosofx =

Holosofx, Inc.
- Type: Privately held company (Acquired by IBM in 2002)
- Founded: 1990
- Headquarters: El-Segundo, CA, United States
- Key people: Hassan Khorshid; Chairman & CEO
- Number of employees: 45 (2002)
- Footnotes; Acquired by IBM in 2002

Holosofx was a privately held company based in El-Segundo, California, United States, that worked in the field of Business Process Management (BPM). IBM acquired Holosofx in 2002. The software department of Holosofx was based in Cairo, Egypt.

Holosofx was founded in 1990 by Hassan Khorshid who is originally from Egypt.

== Origin of Name ==
Holosofx (h ôl ` ô säf ` eks), is derived from the Latin term holop and the Greek term sophic, meaning whole and wisdom, respectively. This name was chosen because its products and services empower corporations to better understand their business processes, the cumulative wisdom of the organization.

== Products ==
Started in 1990, Holosofx provided Business Process Reengineering and consultation services.

The first software product from Holosofx was a modelling tool originally called BPR, later renamed WF-BPR, and finally BPM Workbench.

In 1997, Holosofx extended its portfolio with its BPM Monitor product

At the time of the acquisition of Holosofx by IBM, Holosofx had a portfolio of three products:

- BPM Workbench

Used for modeling and analysis and composed of the Business Modeler as the core with the UML Transformer (Modeler), Xform Designer, and XML Mapper as extensions.

- BPM Monitor

Used for monitoring business processes in real time

- BPM Workbench Server

Used to share process information via the intranet/Internet.

== Acquisition by IBM ==
Holosofx was acquired by IBM on September 12, 2002.

IBM intended to strengthen its WebSphere business integration infrastructure software by acquiring Holosofx which provides business process management software to Fortune 1000 companies.

Holosofx has had a business relationship with IBM since 1998.
