= PointBase =

- Developer: PointBase Inc.
- Written in: Java
- Operating system: Cross-platform
- Type: RDBMS

PointBase is relational database management system (RDBMS) written in the Java programming language.

== History ==
In 1998, Bruce Scott, was the 1st employee of the Oracle Corporation (with Larry Ellison, Bob Miner and Ed Oates), started PointBase Inc. with Jeff Richey (an architect of Sybase) and Daren Race. It was written in pure Java, supported DCOM and CORBA, and was an object–relational database. It was designed to integrate the internet and databases. PointBase Inc. was established in San Mateo, California, then moved to Mountain View, California. Like Java, PointBase was aimed at portable devices.

In the early 2000s, it was the database that was shipped for free with the Java platform.

In 2003, the database was acquired by DataMirror of Markham, Ontario.

In September 2007, IBM acquired DataMirror.

Today (2012) PointBase's SQL Engine is part of Oracle's WebLogic platform.

== Applications ==
It has been shipped with the Oracle WebLogic Server, a Java EE server.

PointBase is supported only for the design, development, and verification of applications; it is not supported for enterprise-quality deployment. The evaluation license of PointBase has a database size limit of 30 MB.

=== Versions ===
- PointBase Server Edition
- PointBase Mobile Edition

== See also ==
- SmallSQL
