= Intel graphics =

Intel graphics may refer to:

- Intel740, a graphics processing unit released in 1998
- Intel Extreme Graphics, a series of integrated graphics released from 2002 to 2003
- Intel Graphics Media Accelerator (GMA), a series of integrated graphics released from 2005 to 2008
- Larrabee (microarchitecture), the code name for an unreleased Intel graphics processing unit
- Intel HD and Iris Graphics, a series of processor-based graphics first released in 2010
- Intel Arc, a series of discrete graphics processing units first released in 2022
- A table of all Intel graphics processing units and integrated graphics released since the Intel740
