= StoredIQ =

- Industry: Information lifecycle management
- Founded: 2001
- Fate: Acquired by IBM in 2012

StoredIQ was a company founded for information lifecycle management (ILM) of unstructured data. Founded in 2001 as Deepfile in Austin, Texas by Jeff Erramouspe, Jeff Bone, Russell Turpin, Rudy Rouhana, Laura Arbilla and Brett Funderburg, the company changed its name in 2005 to StoredIQ. It continued to operate successfully for over a decade until it was acquired in 2012 by IBM. It now serves as a platform for IBM's information life cycle governance, big data governance and enterprise content management technologies.

StoredIQ was awarded five patents by the USPTO. The first, originally filed in 2003, enabled unstructured data in file systems to be manipulated in a similar way to information stored in databases. Subsequent patents built upon the patented actionable file system with further enhancements specific to Enterprise Policy Management and expanding the reach of StoredIQ's management capability all the way to individual desktops.

In 2008 StoredIQ was recognized as "Best in Compliance" by Network Products Guide. At the same time, StoredIQ was being recognized as a "Top 5 Provider" by the prestigious Socha-Gelbmann eDiscovery survey. There were takeover negotiations with EMC Corporation, initially a strategic investor in StoredIQ, however, the company rejected the approach, leaving EMC to acquire a competitor.

The company published a whitepaper titled The Truth About Big Data. This promotion combined with StoredIQ's patented technology led to IBM selecting StoredIQ as the basis for some products.
