= StrongLoop =

American software company

- Type: Private Company
- Industry: Application performance management
- Founded: San Mateo, CA (2012)
- Headquarters: San Mateo, CA, US
- Parent: IBM
- Website: strongloop.com

StrongLoop is an American company working with Node.js to create and support StrongLoop Suite, a Mobile API Tier. StrongLoop employs two members of the Node.js Technical Steering Committee.

== Services ==
StrongLoop offers a subscription-based product known as StrongLoop Suite. StrongLoop Suite includes three components: an open source private mobile Backend-as-a-Service mBaaS named LoopBack; a second component called StrongOps, which provides operations and real-time performance monitoring in a console; and a supported package of Node.js called StrongNode, containing advanced debugging, clustering and support for private npm registries.

== History ==
On February 5, 2013, StrongLoop announced its intention to offer “professional Node.js support and services” via its blog.

In March 2013, the company introduced StrongLoop Node, its own supportable distribution of Node.js, and slnode as a command line tool to go along with it.

On May 22, 2013, StrongLoop announced the general availability of StrongLoop Node 1.0. Al Tsang, Chief Technical Officer of StrongLoop, explained that “Our distribution gives you a path forward to get technical support and bug fix coverage before heading into production.” Tsang later went on to found cloud computing company LunchBadger.

On June 17, 2013, StrongLoop Node 1.0.2 GA was released for Windows, Linux and Mac OS, featuring improvements and upgrades for the latest stable release of Node.js.

It was announced on July 23, 2013, that StrongLoop acquired NodeFly's Node.js monitoring solution. The NodeFly service has been rebranded as StrongOps, better matching the naming scheme of StrongLoop's other products.

On September 18, 2013, web site TechCrunch announced that StrongLoop had raised $8 million in Series A funding and that Isaac Roth had been named as CEO. In addition, StrongLoop announced "Loopback," its open-source mobile backend-as-a-service product that day.

On September 10, 2015, StrongLoop was acquired by IBM.
