= Turbonomic =

U.S.-based enterprise software company

- Type: Subsidiary
- Industry: Virtualization information technology
- Founded: 2008
- Headquarters: Boston, Massachusetts, United States
- Products: Virtualization management software
- Parent: IBM (2021–present)
- Subsidiaries: SevOne; ParkMyCloud
- Website: www.ibm.com/products/turbonomic

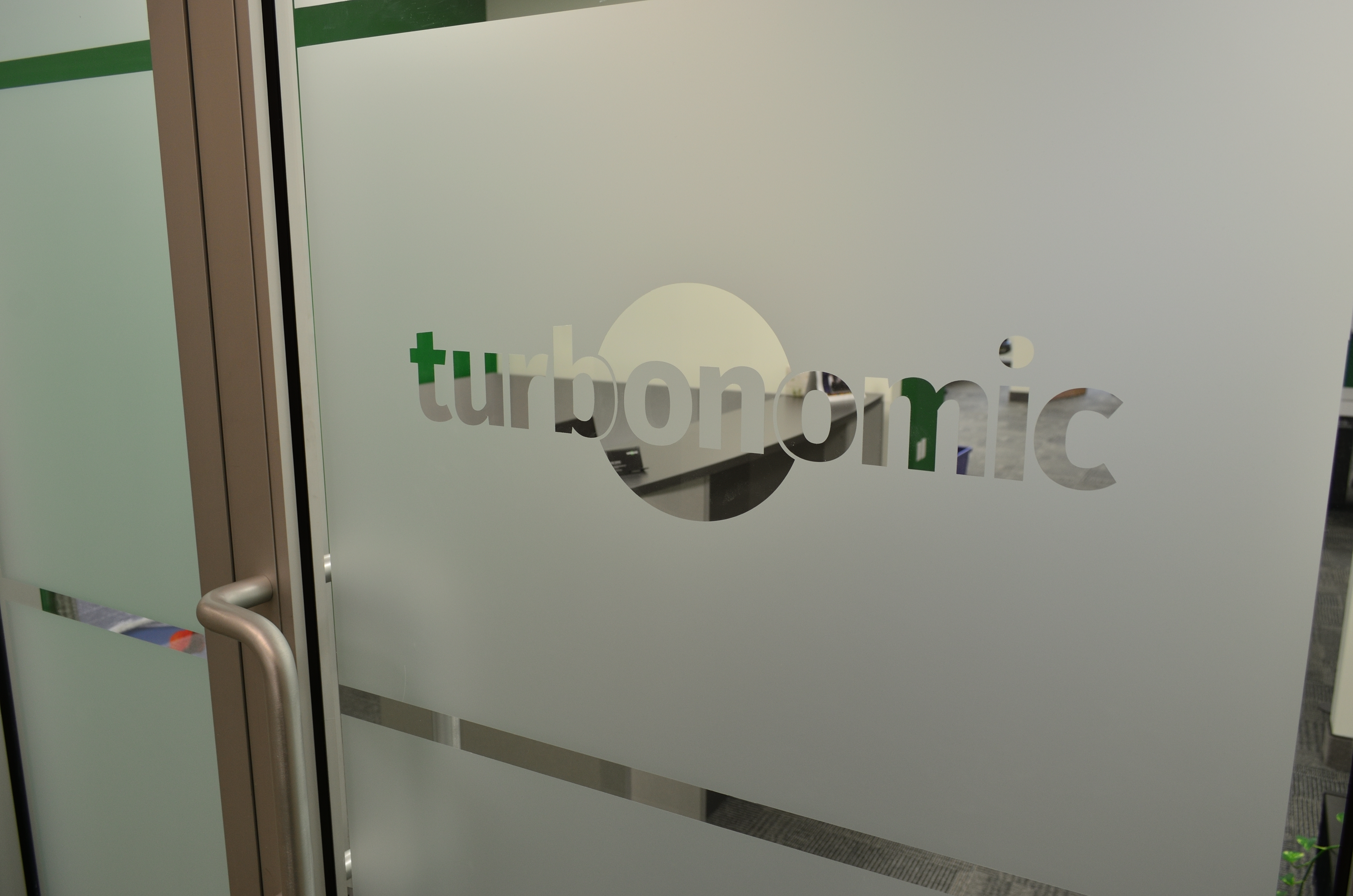
Turbonomic Office

Turbonomic is a resource-simulation software company headquartered in Boston, MA and owned by IBM. The company was originally named VMTurbo.

== History ==
The company formed partnerships with Cisco and IBM, entering into OEM agreements to bring Application Resource Management to a larger customer base.

Since its founding in 2008 or 2009, Turbonomic had raised more than $250M from venture capital firms including Bain Capital Ventures and Highland Capital Partners.

The company's product was updated in 2017 for use with cloud computing platforms.

The company was originally named VMTurbo and changed its name to Turbonomic in August 2016.

Turbonomic acquired ParkMyCloud and SevOne in 2019.

IBM acquired Turbonomic on June 17, 2021.

The company's product simulates supply and demand forces in order to efficiently allocate resources such as computing, database, memory and storage.
