= Baselining =

Method for analyzing computer network performance by comparing against past performance

Baselining is a method for analyzing computer network performance. The method is marked by comparing current performance to a "baseline" derived from past performance. If the performance of a network switch or other network components is measured over a period of time, that performance figure can be used as a comparative baseline for configuration changes.

== Uses ==
Baselining is useful for many performance management tasks, including:

- Monitoring daily network performance
- Measuring trends in network performance
- Assessing whether network performance is meeting requirements laid out in a service agreement
