= Ounce Labs =

Technology Company

- Industry: software
- Founded: 2002
- Headquarters: Waltham, Massachusetts
- Parent: IBM
- Website: www.ouncelabs.com

Ounce Labs (an IBM company) is a Waltham, Massachusetts-based security software vendor. The company was founded in 2002 and created a software analysis product that analyzes source code to identify and remove security vulnerabilities. The security software looks for a range of vulnerabilities that leave an application open to attack. Customers have included GMAC, Lockheed Martin, and the U.S. Navy.

On July 28, 2009, Ounce was acquired by IBM, for an undisclosed sum, with the intention of integrating it into IBM's Rational Software business.

== Platform support ==
Programming languages that are supported by Ounce's security scan include ASP.NET, C, C++, C# and other .NET languages, Java, JSP, VB.NET, classic ASP; and platform support for Windows, Solaris, and Linux.
