= SevOne =

SevOne, Inc.
- Type: Private
- Industry: Network Management; Server Monitoring; Application Monitoring
- Founded: 2005
- Founders: Vess Bakalov Tanya Bakalov
- Headquarters: Boston, MA, United States of America
- Key people: Jim Melvin; COO
- Number of employees: 250+
- Parent: IBM (2021-present)
- Website: www.SevOne.com

SevOne is a software company that was founded in 2005. It was named after the slang for the "severity one" performance problems network managers face.

SevOne was acquired by Turbonomic in 2019. Then as part of Turbonomic, the SevOne product line was acquired in 2021 by IBM, and made available by IBM as IBM SevOne Network Performance Management (NPM).

IBM SevOne NPM provides monitoring and analytics for the digital infrastructure, including networks, servers, and cloud datacenters.

== History ==
The company was founded in 2005 in Newark, Delaware by computer scientists from the University of Delaware who also served as network architects at leading financial institutions.

In July 2007, venture capital firm Osage Ventures led a Series A Preferred placement in SevOne. In March 2009, Osage led a second round of financing in SevOne, along with several private investors.

In January 2013, SevOne announced a $150 million investment from Bain Capital.

In September 2015, SevOne announced a $50 million Series C financing round led by Westfield Capital Management and Bain Capital Ventures. Brookside Capital, HarbourVest, VT Technology Ventures, and Osage Venture Partners also participated in this round.

In November 2019, SevOne was acquired by Turbonomic.

In April 2021, IBM announced it was acquiring Turbonomic, SevOne's parent company.
