= Acquisition of the IBM PC business by Lenovo =

2005 American business acquisition

- Logo of Lenovo between 2003 and 2015

- Logo of IBM since 1972
- Initiator: Lenovo
- Target: IBM Personal Systems Group
- Cost: $1.75B USD (¥14.48B)
- Initiated: December 7, 2004
- Completed: May 3, 2005

The acquisition of IBM Personal Systems Group, the PC business arm of International Business Machines (IBM) Corporation, by Lenovo was announced on December 7, 2004, and was completed on May 3, 2005.

== Background ==
In September 1992, IBM combined and spun off their various microcomputer manufacturing divisions into an autonomous wholly owned subsidiary known as the IBM Personal Computer Company (IBM PC Co.). This corporate restructuring came after IBM reported a sharp drop in profit margins during the second quarter of fiscal year 1992; market analysts attributed the drop to a fierce price war in the personal computer market over the summer of 1992. The corporate restructuring was one of the largest and most expensive in history up to that point. By the summer of 1993, the IBM PC Co. had divided into multiple business units itself, including Ambra Computer Corporation and the IBM Power Personal Systems Group, the former an attempt to design and market "clone" computers of IBM's own architecture and the latter responsible for IBM's PowerPC-based workstations.

In 1998, IBM merged the enterprise-oriented Personal Systems Group of the IBM PC Co. into IBM's own Global Services personal computer consulting and customer service division. The resulting merged business units then became known simply as IBM Personal Systems Group. A year later, IBM stopped selling their computers at retail outlets after their market share in this sector had fallen considerably behind competitors Compaq and Dell. Immediately afterwards, the IBM PC Co. was dissolved and merged into IBM Personal Systems Group.

On September 14, 2004, LG and IBM announced that their business alliance in the South Korean market would end at the end of that year. Both companies stated that it was unrelated to the charges of bribery earlier that year. Xnote was originally part of the joint venture and was sold by LG in 2012.

== Acquisition ==
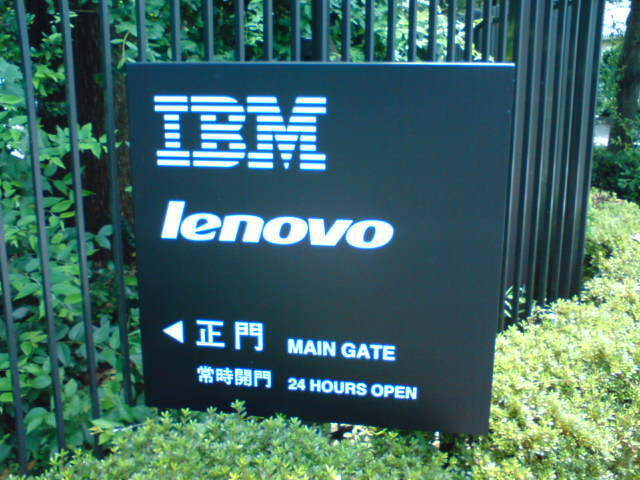
Sign outside of the IBM Yamato Facility in Japan in 2007

On December 3, 2004, The New York Times reported that according to involved people IBM wanted to sell their PC business. IBM spokesperson Edward Barbini stated: "IBM has a policy of not confirming or denying rumors." On December 7, 2004, Chinese technology firm Lenovo announced its intent to purchase the IBM Personal Systems Group for $1.25 billion in a cash and stock, plus assuming $0.5 billion in liabilities; In 2005, some doubts were raised on the matter of national security of the United States. On March 9 of that year, the Committee on Foreign Investment in the United States confirmed to IBM that the acquisition could finish. That day, the acquisition was approved by the United States Department of Justice. The deal was closed on May 3, 2005. Part of the deal included that Lenovo would move their global headquarters from Beijing to New York. Circa 2009, all Think products were rebranded under Lenovo label.

Starting in 2006, Lenovo distanced themselves from the IBM brand.

In 2007, IBM sold US$85 million of Lenovo shares.

In December 2007, the "Lenovo Pride Day" event was held. Lenovo employees peeled off the IBM stickers from their equipment and replaced it with Lenovo stickers.

== Further developments ==
In 2014, Lenovo also acquired from IBM the x86-based server (System x) business for US$2.3 billion.

Columnist Tim Bajarin from PC Mag stated in 2015 that he was originally highly pessimistic about the deal. He suspected that talented employees would not leave IBM. He praised the Lenovo employees for doing a good job on integrating the business.

When former CEO of IBM Samuel J. Palmisano planned on departing in 2011, he was interviewed by The New York Times. He stated that he avoided negotiations with Dell and private equity firms and preferring Lenovo for strategic reasons. He said that the government of China wanted their companies to expand globally, and the deal enhanced IBM's position in the Chinese market.

== See also ==
- List of mergers and acquisitions by IBM
- Acquisition of Sun Microsystems by Oracle Corporation
- Acquisition of Activision Blizzard by Microsoft
