= Ansul =

American fire safety company

Ansul, Inc.
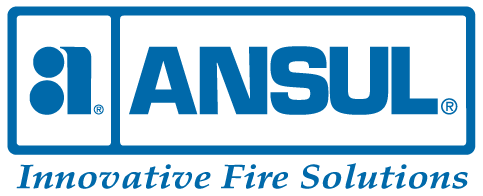
- Industry: Chemical
- Founded: 1915
- Founder: Francis G. Hood
- Headquarters: Operational/Corporate: Marinette, Wisconsin, U.S.
- Key people: George R. Oliver, President; Dave Eickman, VP Operations; Bob Roche, CFO
- Products: Fire Protection Services, Safety Products
- Revenue: ▲$480 million US$ (2007)
- Number of employees: 640 (2007)
- Parent: Johnson Controls
- Website: ANSUL

Ansul is a corporation headquartered in Marinette, Wisconsin that manufactures fire suppression systems, extinguishers, and administers fire training. Ansul's initial activities included production of cattle feed, refrigerants and selected specialty chemicals. The name Ansul comes from ANhydrous SULfur dioxide (SO_{2}), which was sold to die works and fruit preservers, and later as a refrigerant. Production of fire suppression chemicals began in 1934. Virginia Chemicals, Inc. (now part of Celanese Corporation) acquired the Refrigeration and Air Conditioning Products Division of The Ansul Company in 1967, and by 1983 Ansul had discontinued all other production at the facility in Marinette. The US government is a major customer for Ansul.

The ANSUL name is a premium brand of Tyco Fire Protection Products. The full line of ANSUL special hazard fire protection products includes fire extinguishers and hand line units; pre-engineered restaurant, vehicle, and industrial systems; sophisticated fire detection/suppression systems, and a complete line of dry chemical, foam, and gaseous extinguishing agents. A common hand-held fire extinguisher produced by Ansul is the SENTRY brand stored-pressure fire extinguisher.

== History ==
Ansul was created by Francis "Frank" G. Hood from the bankrupt Bastol Company, an enterprise started in Marinette in 1912. It remained independent until 1978, when it was acquired by Wormald International, an Australian corporation. Wormald was in turn acquired by Tyco International in 1990. Ansul now exists as a brand of the Tyco Fire Protection segment of Tyco International, which in turn is part of Johnson Controls International plc.

The company changed its name over the years but always kept Ansul as part of its name. From 1915 to 1963 it was the Ansul Chemical Company, from 1963 to 1981: the Ansul Company, and from 1981 to 1995 Ansul Fire Protection. The current name has been used since 1995.

=== Leadership ===
Early leadership was quite stable, primarily under the Hood family. Once the company was acquired, turnover has been much more rapid as evidenced by this chronology of the presidents of Ansul:

- 1915–1938: Francis "Frank" G. Hood
- 1938–1948: Harvey V. Higley
- 1948–1949: Francis J. Hood
- 1949–1974: Robert C. Hood
- 1974–1976: Morris L. Neuville
- 1976–1980: Terrell L. Ruhlman
- 1980–1983: William A. Rickel
- 1983–1986: Marc V. Gross
- 1987–1990: J. Donald Roland
- 1990–1992: Mark E. Mathisen
- 1992–2002: Karl J. Kinkead
- 2002–2007: Mark VanDover
- 2007–Aug 2007 as vice president.: Colleen Repplier
- 2006–present (2017): George R. Oliver (President of Tyco Fire Protection, formerly Tyco Safety Products)

== Product categories and trade names ==
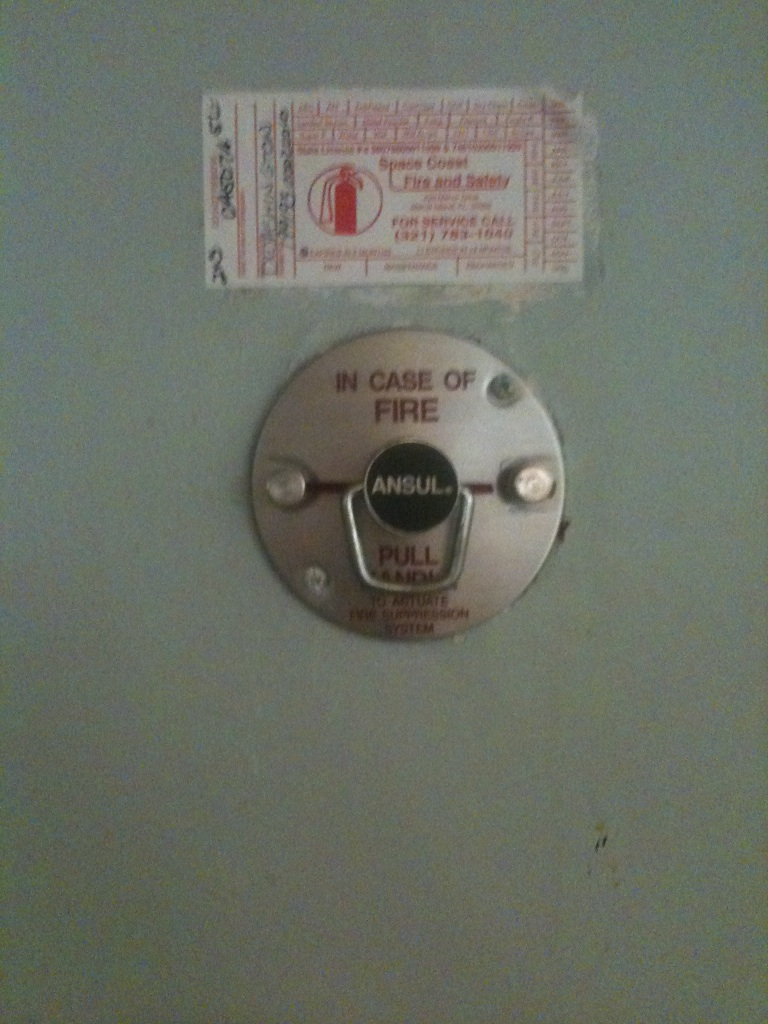
An Ansul restaurant fire suppression system pull station in a hospital cafeteria in Port Charlotte, Florida

ANSUL is the registered trade name for Ansul's products and is often used in conjunction with the trade name for their specific products, such as ANSUL SENTRY fire extinguishers.

=== Portable fire extinguishers ===
- RED LINE
- SENTRY
- CLEANGUARD
- K-GUARD

=== Large manual handline units ===
- MAGNUM

=== Vehicle fire suppression systems ===
- Checkfire

=== Restaurant fire suppression systems ===
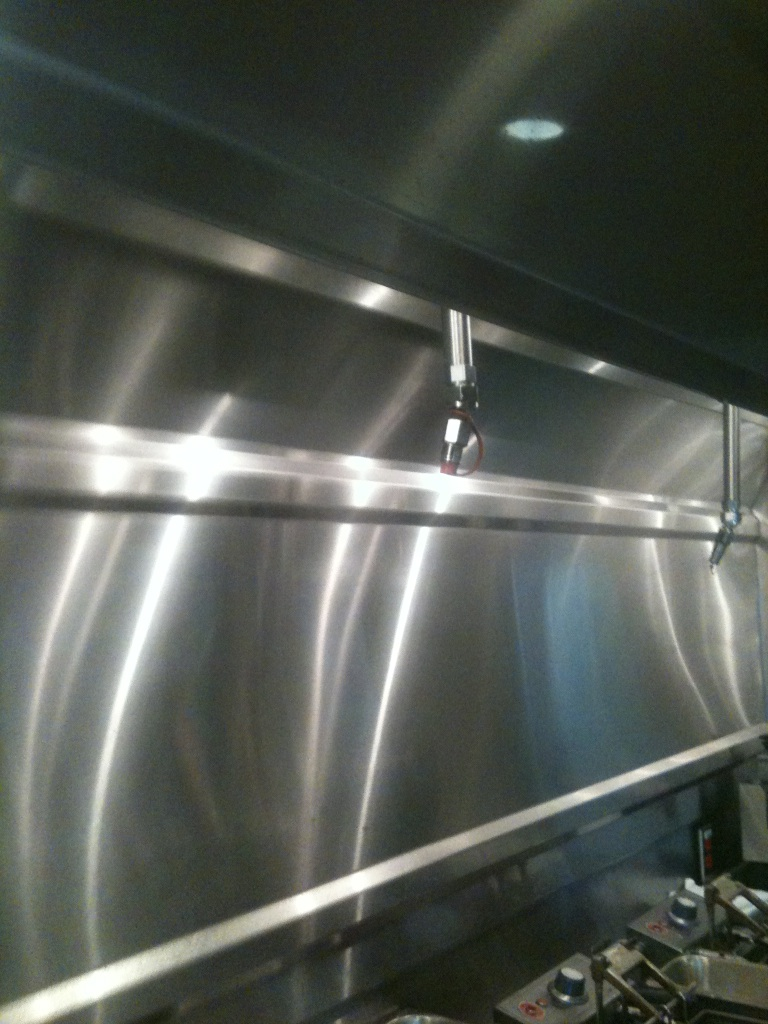
Ansul fire suppression system in a hospital cafeteria

- PIRANHA
- K-GUARD (Kitchen-Class Fire Extinguishers)
- R-102
- Kitchen Knight II (KK-II)

=== Industrial fire suppression systems ===
- I-101

=== Clean-agent fire suppression systems ===
- INERGEN
- SAPPHIRE

=== Carbon dioxide fire suppression systems ===
(No trade names known in this category)

=== Water-atomizing fire suppression systems ===
- AQUASONIC

=== Detection and control equipment ===
- AUTOPULSE

=== Dry chemical and dry powder agents ===
- FORAY
- MET-L-X
- LITH-X
- NA-X
- COPPER POWDER NAVY 125S
- PLUS-FIFTY-B
- PLUS-FIFTY-C
- MET-L-KYL..

=== Firefighting foam products ===
- TARGET-7

=== Spill control products ===
- SPILL-X
- SPILL-X-A
- SPILL-X-S
- SPILL-X-C
- SPILL-X-FP

== Recalls ==
2001: In certain circumstances, seemingly isolated to McDonald's restaurants, detection cables in R-102 systems can fray, fatigue, and fail. Ansul will pay the suppression company to make repairs.

2006: Ansul cooperated with the U.S. Consumer Product Safety Commission (CPSC) to voluntarily recall about 154,000 K-GUARD, SENTRY and FLAG FIRE Model Fire Extinguishers because if the fire extinguisher is dropped horizontally from a height of approximately 2 to 3 feet (0.91 m), the internal pick-up tube could crack and the extinguisher can fail to discharge properly.

2006: SimplexGrinnell LP, ADT Security Services Inc., and Ansul Inc. were distributors for Tyco Fire & Security Fire Detection Systems made in China with faulty sensors. Sensors could experience reduced sensitivity to smoke in conditions of high humidity and high temperature. A product safety recall was conducted by the firm in cooperation with the CPSC.

2009: Marine high pressure carbon dioxide systems are inadvertently discharging due to an internal pressure vent on the cylinder valve that may not be adequately venting pressure. This can cause the cylinder to actuate, which then causes all other cylinders on the system to actuate. Marine high pressure carbon dioxide valves with a date code range of 10–07 to 06-08 should be replaced.

== Litigation ==
Ansul was among ten defendants in Miller v. Ansul Inc., Western Fire Protection, et al, Case #688690, San Diego County Superior Court, in 1995. Miller was injured while depressurizing an unrestrained Halon tank. Miller won the case.

Former employee Daniel Grace successfully sued Ansul in 1999 for age discrimination. The case was decided by the United States District Court for the Northern District of Illinois, Eastern Division.

Ansul et al. were named as defendants in a 2005 lawsuit alleging that the use of Agent Orange by the U.S. military led to birth defects for Vietnamese children. The United States District Court for the Eastern District of New York ruled that the defending companies were operating under the direct order of the President and as such could not be sued for the consequences of the use of their product. The court also ruled the British had previously used Agent Orange during the Malayan Emergency in the 1950s and that they set the precedent for America's use during the Vietnam War.

== Environmental record ==
=== Emissions ===
Environmentally, Ansul ranked in 2002 among the dirtiest/worst facilities in the US for cancer risk (air and water releases) and non-cancer risk score (air and water releases) due to chromium and copper. Chemicals discharged from Ansul in 2011 include:

Chemicals transferred to other sites:

- certain glycol ethers
- chromium
- ethylene glycol
- lead
- tert-butyl alcohol

Chemicals released to the air:

- certain glycol ethers
- chromium
- ethylene glycol
- lead
- nitric acid
- tert-butyl alcohol
- zinc compounds

Chemicals released to surface water:

- chromium
- lead
- zinc compounds

=== Arsenic contamination ===
Surface water near Ansul is the adjacent Menominee River. The river bottom and groundwater are heavily contaminated with arsenic compounds that were released by Ansul from 1957 to 1977 as a result of herbicide manufacture, with certain spots of river sediment containing levels as high as 11,000 ppm arsenic. For six of those years (1960–1966), arsenic-laden wastewater was discharged directly into the river. These discharges and contaminations were the result of an accumulation of more than 95,000 short tons (86,000 t) of arsenic salt that was at one time stored on site. The company consequently operated under two consent orders (Wisconsin Department of Natural Resources (WDNR) Consent Order 2A-73-714; and Administrative Order on Consent (AOC) between the U.S. Environmental Protection Agency, the WDNR, and Ansul, signed on September 28, 1990). As a result of the US EPA AOC, Ansul agreed in February 2009 to spend an estimated US$28 million to:

- remove ≈74,000 cubic yards (57,000 m^{3}) of arsenic-contaminated sediments from the Menominee River
- construct an impermeable barrier wall to bedrock around 40 acres (160,000 m^{2})
- cap or remove approximately 4.2 acres (17,000 m^{2}) of surface soils contaminated with arsenic above 16-32 ppm
- pump and treat contaminated groundwater

Total remediation efforts and their costs are:

- 1976–1984, US$11 million to pump and treat contaminated groundwater and install a groundwater interceptor trench at the southern edge of the property.
- 1998–1999, US$12.4 million to dam and remove arsenic-contaminated sediments from the 8th Street Slip and install an impermeable barrier system to bedrock around the 8th Street Slip and an adjacent Salt Vault
- 2012–2013 (est.), $25 million to dredge and cap river sediments.

In November 2011, the local newspaper reported that Tyco (Ansul) is still negotiating with the EPA and WDNR to work out a plan, which has been submitted to the EPA for approval. Disclosed at a meeting with the Local Menominee River Area of Concern Citizens Advisory Committee was a plan to partially dredge and partially cap the arsenic. Estimated to cost US$24 million and take two years, 100,000 cubic yards (76,000 m^{3}) of contaminated sediment would be removed from an area of 3 acres (12,000 m^{2}) - 3.5 acres (14,000 m^{2}) acres around the Eighth Street Slip, which would be replaced with sand from another (undisclosed) area of the river and topped with stone. However, the EPA has indicated that it wants Ansul to dredge the sediment from all ≈19 acres (77,000 m^{2}). The Tyco proposal also includes capping ≈3.5 acres (14,000 m^{2}), leaving 100,000 cubic yards (76,000 m^{3}) of contaminated sediment in place. If approved, this project would commence in June 2012.

The Tyco proposal was rejected by the EPA in 2012, and 250,000 cubic yards (190,000 m^{3}) of sediment was ordered to be removed from the main channel, the turning basin, areas directly east of the turning basin, the Sixth Street Slip, and the south channel. Tyco hired Sevenson Environmental Services of New York as the general contractor for the project, which began in July 2012. (Sevenson was also the general contractor to clean up the infamous Love Canal site in New York.) The project is slated for completion by Nov. 1, 2013, and the current estimate of cost is US$25 million.

Tyco created a website in 2011 specifically for the cleanup project, featuring reports, news, and FAQs.

=== Community impact ===
The arsenic contamination of the river bed has been problematic for a neighboring corporation, Marinette Marine (MMC). MMC is a shipbuilder with government contracts. Among their limitations for vessel size is the ship's draft, which must be less than the depth of the Menominee River. MMC is located immediately upstream of Ansul, and because of the arsenic contamination of the river bed, MMC's desires to dredge the river have been stymied until Ansul's remediation efforts can be completed. The United States Army Corps of Engineers (USACE) estimated in 1986 that 40,000 cubic yards of sediment would need to be dredged.

The arsenic contamination causes a beneficial use impairment (BUI) resulting in local regulations that restrict anchoring of boats adjacent to the Ansul property, as anchors may disturb the arsenic-laden sediments. A “Menominee River No Anchor Zone” is conspicuously posted.

USA Today reported that Marinette schools are in the top 5 percentile for the most exposure to air pollution. St. Thomas Aquinas Academy High School (formerly known as Marinette Catholic Central High School until 2004) is adjacent to Ansul's property, and next to it is the Marinette Middle School (formerly Marinette High School until 1973). Marinette High School is adjacent to the Ansul Fire Technology Center, where tons of chemicals are used annually to train fire fighters.

== See also ==
- Ansul Fire School
- Ansul Islands
- Marinette Marine
- Tyco International
