= Wyze Labs =

American company

Wyze Labs, Inc.
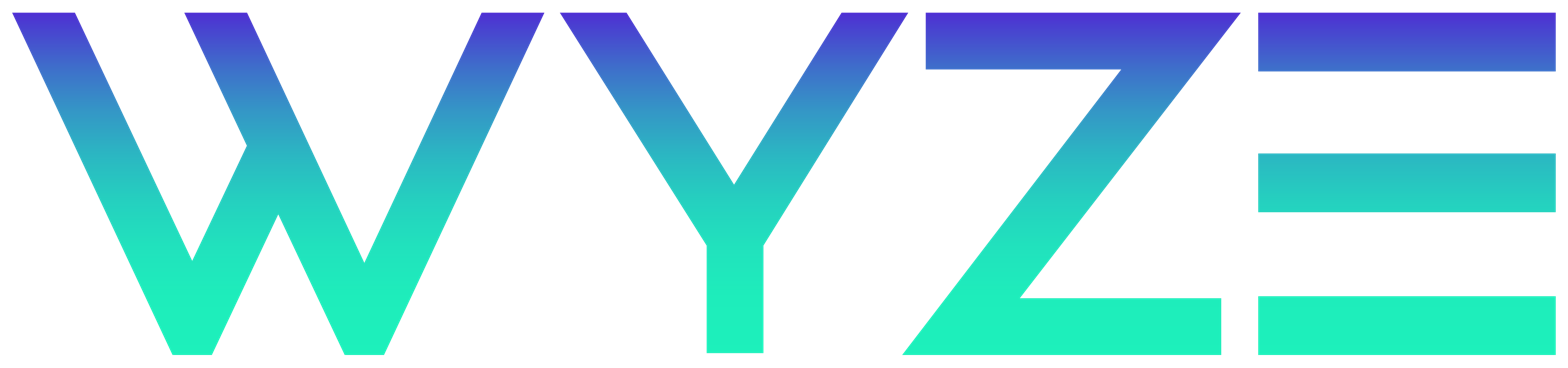
- Company type: Private
- Founded: July 19, 2017; 9 years ago
- Headquarters: Kirkland, Washington, U.S.
- Area served: United States
- Founders: Yun Zhang; Dongsheng Song; Dave Crosby; Elana Fishman
- CEO: Yun Zhang
- Products: Cameras; Smart home; Lifestyle
- Employees: 350
- Website: www.wyze.com

Wyze Labs, Inc. (formerly Wyzecam), also known as Wyze, is an American technology company based in Kirkland, Washington, that specializes in smart home products and wireless cameras. Wyze was founded by former Amazon employees.

== History ==
Wyze was incorporated on July 19, 2017 in Seattle, by four co-founders: CEO Yun Zhang, CPO Dongsheng Song, CMO Dave Crosby, and Elana Fishman. Wyze released their first product, the WyzeCam v1, priced at $19.99 on October 24, 2017. Shortly after, the Wyze Cam V2 was released. By October 24, 2018, Wyze had sold 1 million units of the Wyze Cam. In May 2018, Wyze expanded its camera lineup with the Wyze Cam Pan, a $30 motorized camera capable of 360-degree rotation, tilting, and automatic motion tracking.

By 2019, the company introduced several non-camera devices, including the Wyze Bulb, Wyze Plug, and Wyze Sense contact and motion sensors, integrated into the company's mobile application. In 2019, Wyze partnered with Seattle-based artificial intelligence company Xnor.ai to add person-detection capabilities to its Wyze Cam v2 and Wyze Cam Pan models through a firmware update. The feature processed image data locally on the devices rather than through cloud-based services. Following the acquisition of Xnor.ai by Apple later that year, the partnership ended and Wyze removed the feature in early 2020. The company subsequently developed its own artificial intelligence features, which were later incorporated into its Cam Plus subscription service.

Version 3 of its security camera, Wyze Cam v3, was launched in 2020 with outdoor-rated protection, and additional imaging features, such as color night vision, a wider field of view, and motion-triggered features such as a built-in siren.

Wyze broadened its product range beyond cameras in 2020. In September 2020, it released the Wyze Video Doorbell, a wired 1080p doorbell camera priced at $29.99. In December 2020, it launched Wyze Home Monitoring, a home security service offering self-monitoring and professional monitoring through a partnership with Noonlight.

In 2022, Wyze was included in Time's 100 Most Influential Companies of 2022.

At the end of 2022, Wyze announced 2023, as the "year of the camera", and released three new cameras as of March 2, 2023. These included the Wyze Cam OG and Cam OG Telephoto, released on January 17, 2023, at a starting price of $19.99, and the Wyze Cam Pan v3, the company's first IP65 weather-resistant pan-and-tilt camera. In March 2024, Wyze released the Wyze Cam v4, a flagship model featuring 2.5K QHD resolution and improved color night vision.

== Funding ==
Shortly after being founded in July 2017, Wyze Labs raised $20 million in seed funding in November 2019, with participation from iSeed Ventures.

In March 2020, when the COVID-19 pandemic hit the world, Wyze was on the verge of shutting down, but the company managed to survive the pandemic by reducing the amount of money it originally wanted to raise from 50 million to 10 million, and by adding the Cam Plus subscription plan, among other things.

In 2021, Wyze Labs closed a $110 million Series B funding round led by Marcy Venture Partners, with participation from Eastern Bell Venture Capital, American Family Ventures, and Kensington Capital Partners.

== Disputes and security concerns ==
In 2019 Sensormatic, a wholly owned subsidiary of Johnson Controls, sued Wyze, alleging seven patent violations. Wyze prevailed in the lawsuit, as of September 2020.

In December 2019, the company acknowledged that a server leak had exposed the details of roughly 2.4 million customers. The company's response included logging all users out of their accounts, requiring all users to reauthenticate.

In 2021, Xiaomi submitted a report to Amazon alleging that Wyze had infringed upon its 2019 "Autonomous Cleaning Device and Wind Path Structure of Same" robot vacuum patent. On July 15, 2021, Wyze filed a lawsuit against Xiaomi in the U.S. District Court for the Western District of Washington, arguing that prior art exists and asking the court for a declaratory judgment that Xiaomi's 2019 robot vacuum patent is invalid.

In 2022, security firm Bitdefender announced that Wyze had discontinued WyzeCam v1 because of a security vulnerability that Bitdefender had reported to Wyze three years before. Wyze did not make any public announcement about the vulnerability.

On September 8, 2023, some users reported on Reddit that the web viewer was showing camera feeds that were not their own. A Wyze spokesperson said this was due to a web caching issue.

In February 2024, about 13,000 Wyze home security customers were shown someone else's home. Following the 2024 incident, Wyze expanded its security engineering efforts, introduced additional security testing and verification measures, and revised aspects of its security and compliance practices. In 2025, the company introduced VerifiedView, a feature that writes a hashed version of the account's user ID into camera firmware and embeds it in the metadata of every image, video and stream; content is served only if the requesting account's ID matches the embedded identifier, and mismatched livestream requests are refused.

== Activities ==
Wyze develops and markets consumer smart home products that operate through mobile application. Its products include connected security cameras, video doorbells, smart lighting devices, smart plugs, sensors, and home access and climate control products. The company also develops home monitoring and automation devices, including smart locks, thermostats, and environmental sensors, as well as household appliances such as robot vacuums. The company's ecosystem is structured around interoperability between devices, enabling users to manage security, lighting, and home automation functions through its platform. It also provides software-based services that support device connectivity, cloud features, and subscription-based functionality for monitoring and analytics.
