= Ansul Islands =

Islands in Marinette County, Wisconsin

Coordinates: 45°07′07″N 87°40′22″W

The Ansul Islands, named after the Ansul Company (now part of Tyco International), are two islands in the Menominee River and located in Marinette County, Wisconsin, United States. The islands are part of Porterfield, Wisconsin.
