= Dennis Kozlowski =

American businessman and convict

Leo Dennis Kozlowski (born November 16, 1946) is the former CEO of Tyco International, convicted in 2005 of crimes related to his receipt of $81 million in unauthorized bonuses, the purchase of art for $14.725 million and the payment by Tyco of a $20 million investment banking fee to Frank Walsh, a former Tyco director.

He served more than six and a half years in New York state prisons, and was released in 2014. Separately, Tyco filed suit against Kozlowski and prevailed, with the court finding that the $500 million in compensation and benefits he received during his time of disloyalty, between 1997 and 2002, were forfeited back to the company under New York's "faithless servant" doctrine.

== Early life ==
Kozlowski was born in Newark, New Jersey. His mother, Agnes (née Kozell), worked for the Newark Police Department and as a school crossing guard, and his father, Leo Kelly Kozlowski, worked for the Public Service Transport. His parents were second-generation Polish-Americans. Kozlowski attended Seton Hall University, a Catholic university.

== Tyco International ==
Kozlowski joined Tyco in 1975, becoming CEO in 1992. With Kozlowski at the helm, Tyco massively expanded during the late 1990s.

In 1999, Tyco began shifting the company's headquarters operations from Exeter, New Hampshire, to Boca Raton, Florida, where Kozlowski had a home. At one point, 1,650 Tyco employees were based in Boca Raton.

Although Kozlowski was one of America's highest-paid executives, Tyco spent millions to benefit him, financing personal extravagances and secretly forgiving loans.

The company consistently beat Wall Street's expectations and through a series of strategic mergers and acquisitions, ushered in a new era of mega-conglomerates. Kozlowski left Tyco in 2002, amid a controversy in regard to his compensation package.

=== Scandal, trial, and conviction ===
Kozlowski was tried twice. The first attempt was a ruled mistrial when one of the jurors was threatened by the public after being reported to have made an OK sign towards Kozlowski's lawyers. Kozlowski testified on his own behalf during the second trial, stating that his pay package was "confusing" and "almost embarrassingly big," but that he never committed a crime as the company's top executive.

Along with former Tyco chief financial officer Mark Swartz, Kozlowski was convicted on June 17, 2005 of crimes related to his receipt of $81 million in purportedly unauthorized bonuses, the purchase of art for $14.725 million and the payment by Tyco of a $20 million investment banking fee to Frank Walsh, a former Tyco director. On September 19, 2005 he was sentenced by Judge Michael Obus of the Manhattan Supreme Court to serve from eight years and four months to twenty-five years in prison for his role in the scandal. In addition, Kozlowski and Swartz were ordered to pay a total of $134 million in restitution. Kozlowski was further fined $70 million, while Swartz was fined $35 million. Both were convicted on 22 counts of grand larceny, falsifying business records, securities fraud and conspiracy. His aggregate minimum sentence was set at 8 years and 4 months, and his aggregate maximum sentence was 25 years. In 2009, the U.S. Supreme Court declined to hear Kozlowski's appeal.

During his six and a half years in prison, Kozlowski served time at the Mid-State Correctional Facility in Marcy, New York, and then the Lincoln Correctional Facility in New York City. While in prison, he met other high-profile convicts, including Ja Rule and Alan G. Hevesi.

In April 2012, the parole board denied Kozlowski's request for discretionary release. He was granted work release in 2012, and after a parole hearing, he was conditionally released on January 17, 2014. His parole ended in 2015.

Tyco sued Kozlowski, asserting that the $500 million in compensation and benefits he received during his time of disloyalty, between 1997 and 2002, were forfeit under New York's "faithless servant" doctrine. In 2010, Judge Thomas Griesa concluded that under the faithless servant doctrine, Kozlowski must forfeit all compensation and benefits he earned during his period of disloyalty.

=== Post-prison life ===
Kozlowski ultimately paid $167 million in restitution and fines, evaporating almost all of his wealth. In 2015, following his release, Kozlowski lived in a two-bedroom apartment in the East Side of Manhattan with his third wife, Kimberly. The couple had a passing acquaintance in the 1990s, and reconnected in prison after she wrote him. After exchanging letters, she visited him in prison; they married after his release.

=== Commenting on his trial ===
In 2009, before his trial, Kozlowski asserted his innocence by stating, saying "I am absolutely not guilty of the charges. There was no criminal intent here. Nothing was hidden." After his conviction, but before his appeal was complete, he again denied his guilt, saying that the jury had found him guilty simply on the basis of his huge salary. In a 2013 parole hearing, Kozlowski admitted his culpability, saying, "It was greed, pure and simple. ... I feel horrible ... I can't say how sorry I am and how deeply I regret my actions."

== Personal life ==
Kozlowski has been married three times, and has grandchildren. Kozlowski became notorious for his extravagant lifestyle, supported by the booming stock market of the late 1990s and early 2000s; allegedly, he had Tyco pay for his $30 million New York City apartment which included $6,000 shower curtains and $15,000 "dog umbrella stands".

Tyco paid $1 million (half of the $2 million bill) for the 40th birthday party of Kozlowski's second wife, Karen Mayo Kozlowski. The extravagant party, held on the Italian island of Sardinia, featured an ice sculpture of Michelangelo's David urinating Stolichnaya vodka and a private concert by Jimmy Buffett. In a camcorder video, Dennis Kozlowski states that this party will bring out a Tyco core competency – the ability to party hard. Subsequently, this shareholder meeting/birthday party became known as the Tyco Roman Orgy.

Dennis married Karen Mayo in Antigua in May 2001; they maintained a mansion in Boca Raton. She filed for divorce in Palm Beach County, Florida, in July 2006, a few months after he was sentenced to prison. A divorce settlement was reached in 2008.

In the 1990s, Kozlowski purchased an oceanfront estate in the Squam area of Nantucket island for $5 million. While in prison, he sold the mansion to pay fines and restitution, listing the property for $23 million in June 2006.

Kozlowski was a donor to Middlebury College, which his two daughters attended; he joined the college's board of trustees in 1999, and resigned from the board in 2002, after the scandal emerged. He also was head of the board of trustees of Berwick Academy in South Berwick, Maine, after his daughters had graduated from the school.
