= Wormald International =

Wormald International, LLC / Tyco New Zealand Limited
- Trade name: Wormald
- Type: Privately held company
- Industry: Fire protection
- Predecessor: Russell & Wormald; Wormald Bros. Wormald Brothers Industries Ltd. Wormald International
- Founded: 1889
- Founder: Joseph Dawson Wormald & Henry Percy Wormald
- Area served: Australia, New Zealand, Fiji
- Parent: Evergreen Capital, L.P. (Australia, Fiji) Tyco International (New Zealand)

Wormald is an Australian fire protection brand founded in 1889.

Founded as an importer and distributor of fire doors and fire sprinklers, it grew over the decades into a diversified manufacturer of steel and metal products as well as a leader in the fire protection industry in Australia and New Zealand. Valued at US$1 billion by 1990, it was acquired by American conglomerate Tyco International that year and became part of its fire protection business (today the world's largest).

In 2016 the Australian fire-protection business of Tyco International – including the Wormald brand – was bought out by a New York–based private-equity firm, Evergreen Capital L.P. (who already purchased Tyco's Fijian fire-protection business, as well as the rights to use the Wormald name there). It now operates under local management as Wormald International, LLC.

Tyco International still operates in New Zealand under the Wormald brand with the strapline "A Tyco Business" under the logo in most marketing material, though its official corporate filing is "Tyco New Zealand Limited".

== History ==
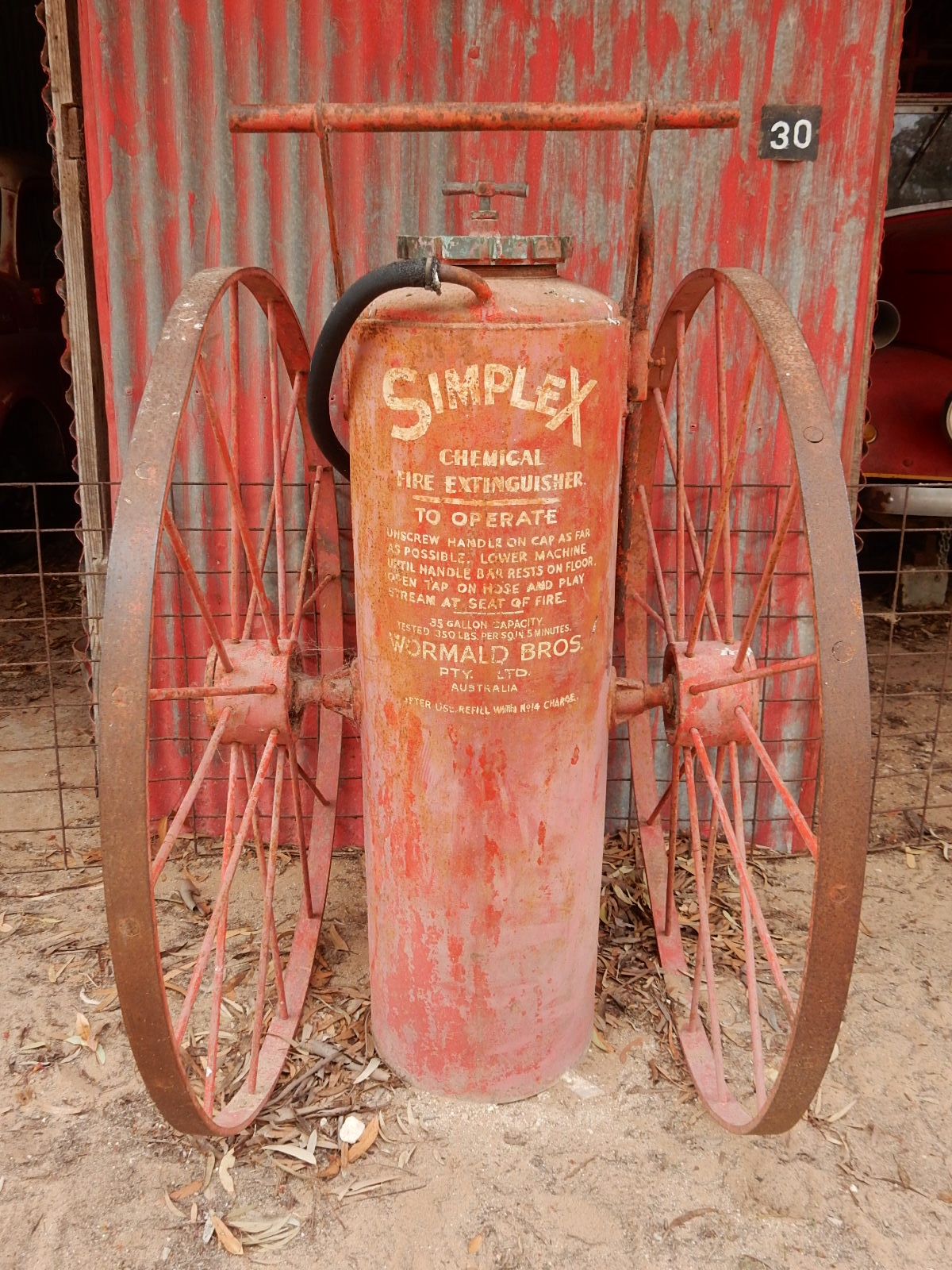
Simplex fire extinguisher.

The founders of the company were brothers Joseph Dawson Wormald (born 1863) and Henry Percy Wormald (born 1874). Born in Edinburgh, Joseph arrived in Australia in 1889 when brother Sir John Wormald, of the Manchester-based engineering firm, Mather & Platt, sought to distribute the company's Grinnell-licensed sprinklers in that country. In partnership with Stanley Russell, Russell & Wormald was formed to manufacture and import the fire sprinklers, as well as Simplex fire extinguishers and fire doors. With Mr. Russell retiring in 1896 to join Mather & Platt as the country manager of France, Harry (who migrated to in Australia in 1890) joined the company as a sub-manager two years later and was admitted into partnership in 1900, Russell & Wormald becoming Wormald Bros., based in Melbourne.

By May 1949, around 60 years after its establishment, Wormald Bros. became a public company, Wormald Brothers Industries Limited, with head offices in Sydney. As well as their core fire protection department, its other operating divisions included Metalbilt, manufacturing doors – including fire doors – and roller shutters; Steelbilt, manufacturers of storage equipment such as steel cabinets, shelving and cupboards and the license for the manufacture of products from the Kirsch Company – "the world's largest manufacturer of Drapery hardware and Venetian Blinds" A 1952 booklet titled "The Story of Wormald Brothers" listed 18 Wormald, Steelbilt or Kirsch factories in Sydney, Melbourne, Newcastle, Ballarat, Hobart, Brisbane, Adelaide, Perth, Auckland, Wellington and Christchurch – as well as 10 other locations in Australia and New Zealand with 'Resident Representatives' or 'Resident Engineers'.

In 1974, the company, now known as Wormald International Limited, acquired Mather & Platt, whose fire-protection products began Wormald's business nearly a century earlier. In 1990, Wormald International, valued at US$1 billion, was itself purchased by Princeton, New Jersey–based Tyco International - becoming part of its Boca Raton, Florida–based fire protection division that included Grinnell Mechanical Products (the company whose fire sprinklers Mather & Platt had licensed to be distributed by Wormald in 1889).

On 4 December 2015, Tyco International's fire-protection business in Australia (encompassing Wormald, National Fire Solutions, GAAM Emergency Products, Exegard and Simplex Time Solutions) was acquired by New York City–based private equity firm Evergreen Capital, LLC. Evergreen Capital had formed an Australasian business relationship with Tyco, having previously acquired Tyco's fire and security operations in Fiji (including the rights to the Wormald brand there) two years previously and purchasing Armourguard, Tyco's New Zealand security division, for a nominal NZ$1 in 2014. The sale was completed on 29 January 2016. The new owners have returned Wormald to local management, claiming that "the sale presents an exciting opportunity for the Wormald business to return to its roots and benefit from a more flexible, less centralised business structure...with a renewed focus on regional-based decision making to provide our customers with...trusted local service".
