= Frederick Grinnell =

Frederick Grinnell (August 14, 1836 – October 21, 1905) was a pioneer in fire safety and was the creator of the first practical automatic fire sprinkler.

== Early life and education ==
He was born in New Bedford, Massachusetts. In 1855, he graduated from Rensselaer Polytechnic Institute.

== Career ==
Earlier in his career, he was draftsman, construction engineer, and manager for various railroad manufacturers. He designed and oversaw construction of more than 100 locomotives. In 1869, he purchased a controlling interest in a company that manufactured fire-extinguishing apparatus. Grinnell licensed a sprinkler device patented by Henry S. Parmalee, then worked to improve the invention, and in 1881 patented the automatic sprinkler that bears his name. He continued to improve the device and in 1890 invented the glass disc sprinkler, essentially the same as that in use today. Such sprinklers are called le Grinnell in France. He secured some 40 distinct patents for improvements on his sprinklers, and invented a dry pipe valve and the automatic fire-alarm system as well.

== General Fire Extinguisher Co. ==
In 1892, Grinnell organized the General Fire Extinguisher Co. in Providence, R.I., an amalgamation of several smaller companies, which became the foremost organization in its field of manufacture. Grinnell died in 1905 in his hometown of New Bedford. In 1919, General Fire Extinguisher Co. was renamed Grinnell Co. In 1969, Grinnell Co. was purchased by ITT (International Telephone & Telegraph) and became ITT Grinnell. A few years later, ITT Grinnell sold its US industrial activities to Tyco International. Grinnell remains today a trade mark inside the Tyco group. In 2001, Grinnell Fire Protection was merged with the Simplex Time Recorder Company to form SimplexGrinnell, which is the largest fire protection company in the world. ITT Grinnell supporting products are still sold today by Anvil International in the US and PSS in Germany.

Grinnell was a director of several banks and manufacturing companies. He was inducted into the Rhode Island Heritage Hall of Fame in 1984.
