= Menominee River =

River in Wisconsin and Michigan

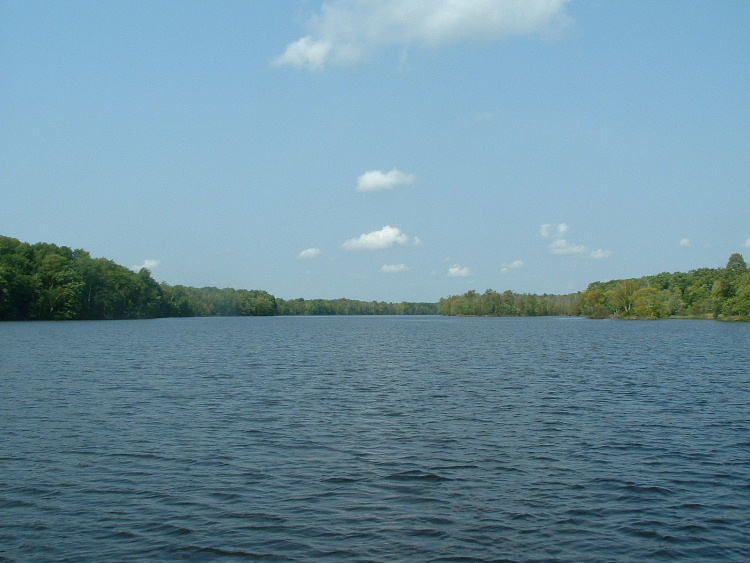
- Menominee River

Physical characteristics
- Source
  - location: Brule and Michigamme rivers
  - coordinates: 45.95328°N 88.19624°W
- Mouth
  - location: Green Bay, Lake Michigan
  - coordinates: 45.0947°N 87.59121°W
- Length: 116 mi (187 km)
- Basin size: 4,070 mi^{2} (10,500 km^{2})
- Discharge
  - location: mouth
  - average: 3,516 cu ft/s (99.6 m^{3}/s) (estimate)

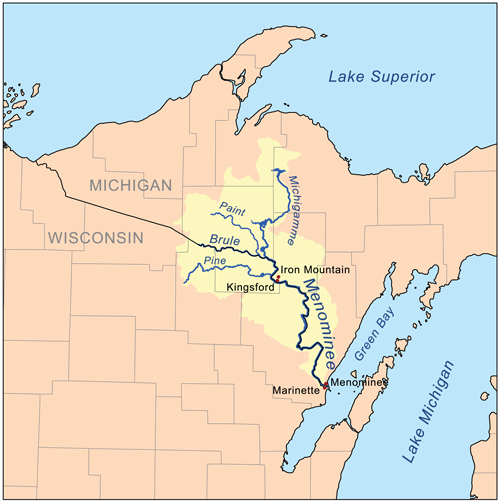
Menominee River watershed

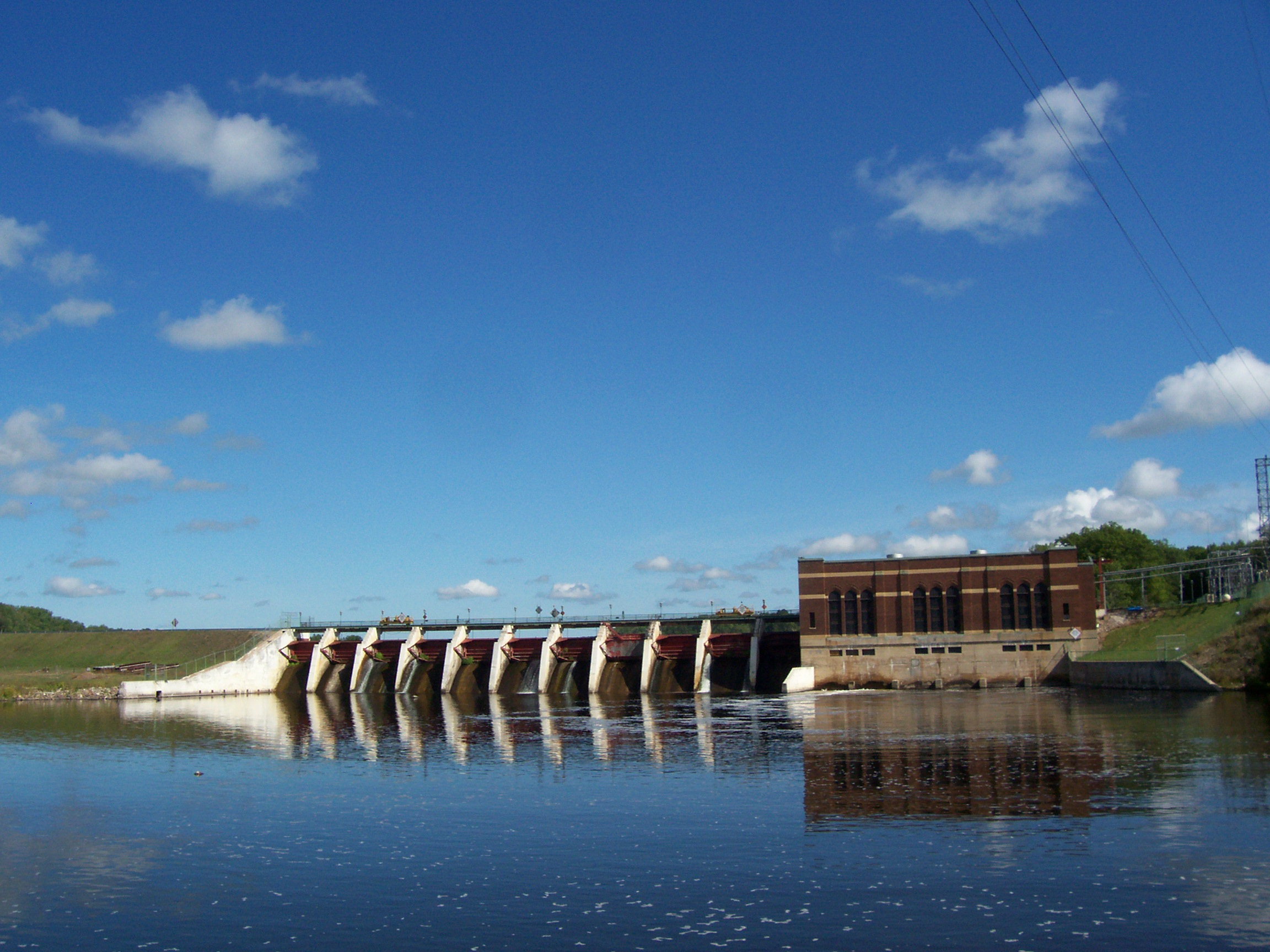
White Rapids Hydroelectric dam

The Menominee River (/məˈnɒməni/ mə-NOM-ə-nee) is a river in northwestern Michigan and northeastern Wisconsin in the United States. It is approximately 116 miles (187 km) long, draining a rural forested area of northern Wisconsin and the Upper Peninsula of Michigan into Lake Michigan. Its entire course, with that of its tributary, the Brule River, forms part of the boundary between the two states.

== Description ==
It is formed approximately 10 miles (16 km) northwest of Iron Mountain, Michigan, by the confluence of the Brule and Michigamme rivers. As the Menominee flows southeast it picks up the Pine River and travels past Kingsford, Michigan and Niagara, Wisconsin. It then flows generally south, making broad meanders collecting the Sturgeon, Pemebonwon and Pike rivers. It enters Green Bay on Lake Michigan from the north between Marinette, Wisconsin and Menominee, Michigan.

Along its course the Menominee River has been converted into a series of large reservoirs. The waters contained in these reservoirs are some of the area's deepest and cleanest lakes. Many of the lands around those waters are managed for recreational use, which ensures conservation and restricts shoreline development of rows of cottages and docks. The lakes are pristine, with wild shores of forest lands.

The name of the river comes from an Ojibwe Algonquian term meaning "wild rice", or "in the place of wild rice". They used the same name for the river as for the historic Menominee tribe who lived in the area and used the plant as a staple. The Menominee are the only Native American tribe living in Wisconsin today whose origin was in the present-day state. The federally recognized Menominee Indian Tribe of Wisconsin have a reservation on the Wolf River (Fox River tributary). The Menominee believe that they were created at the mouth of the Menominee River when the Ancestral Bear emerged from the river mouth and was transformed into the first Menominee by the Creator.

The Chippewa lived in the upper portion of the river basin and referred to the river as Me-ne-cane Sepe or "Many Little Islands River". In the Jesuit Relations, the French missionary priests referred to the river as Rivière de la Folle Avoine or "Wild Oats River", again a reference to the wild rice.

The region through which the river flows was formerly a center of iron ore mining. Menominee River sediments are contaminated with arsenic at Marinette, Wisconsin, from industry. The Back Forty Mine is a proposed gold and zinc open-pit near Stephenson, Michigan to be constructed within 150 feet (46 m) of the river.

== See also ==
- Ansul Islands
- List of rivers of Michigan
- List of rivers of Wisconsin
