= Tyco Integrated Security =

- Company type: Subsidiary of Tyco Fire & Security, Ltd, NYSE: TYC
- Industry: Security products and services, integration and installation
- Founded: 2012, with roots going back to 1874 (American District Telegraph – ADT)
- Headquarters: Boca Raton, Florida, U.S.
- Key people: Mark Vandover, President
- Parent: Tyco International
- Website: www.tycois.com

Tyco Integrated Security is a business unit of Tyco International. It is a company specializing in electronic security products, installation and services. The company's principal place of business in the U.S. is Boca Raton, Florida; and Mississauga, Ontario in Canada with over 10,000 employees and nearly 200 offices throughout North America.

== Corporate history ==
Tyco Integrated Security has roots in the beginning of the North American commercial security industry. In 1874, 57 district telegraph delivery companies affiliated and became "American District Telegraph" which became known as ADT. In July 1997, Tyco merged by reverse takeover with a smaller publicly traded security services company named ADT Limited. Upon consummation of the merger, Tyco International Ltd. of Massachusetts became a wholly owned subsidiary of ADT Limited, and simultaneously ADT changed its name to Tyco International Ltd., retaining the former Tyco stock symbol, TYC. A new subsidiary named ADT Security Services was also formed out of the merger.

In September 2011, Tyco International, Ltd., directors announced plan to split into three companies. In September of the following year they completed the separation of the company into Flow Control business – Pentair, North America's residential security business – ADT and its international fire and security business - Tyco International, Ltd. ADT Business Solutions became Tyco Integrated Security a business unit of Tyco International, Ltd. As a business unit of Tyco International Ltd., the company provides security solutions for the commercial, retail, industrial and governmental markets in the US and Canada. ADT Residential continues as a separate company focused on security products for residential and small business customers in the US. Tyco International, Ltd., retains use of the ADT brand for security installation and services outside of North America.

== Executive leadership ==
- Mark VanDover – President
