= Grinnell Mechanical Products =

American organization

- Type: Tyco International
- Industry: Mechanical, HVAC, Commercial, Mining, Institutional and Industrial
- Founded: 1850
- Headquarters: Lansdale, Pennsylvania, U.S.
- Key people: Colleen Repplier, President
- Parent: Tyco International
- Website: www.grinnell.com

Grinnell Mechanical Products, a brand of Tyco International Ltd., manufactures grooved piping and mechanical products. Grinnell Mechanical Products specializes in mechanical, fire, HVAC, commercial, mining, institutional and industrial applications. Grinnell grooved products are used in various industries because they are historically more efficient than flanged, welded, and threaded pipe joining methods. Key product lines include grooved couplings and fittings, G-PRESS systems, strainers, stainless steel systems, copper systems, and G-MINE PVC systems. Grinnell Mechanical Products offers mechanical services used for supporting engineering and design. These include 2D and 3D drawings for the mechanical room and design suggestions and easy to follow installation drawings with legends for each pump.

== Products ==
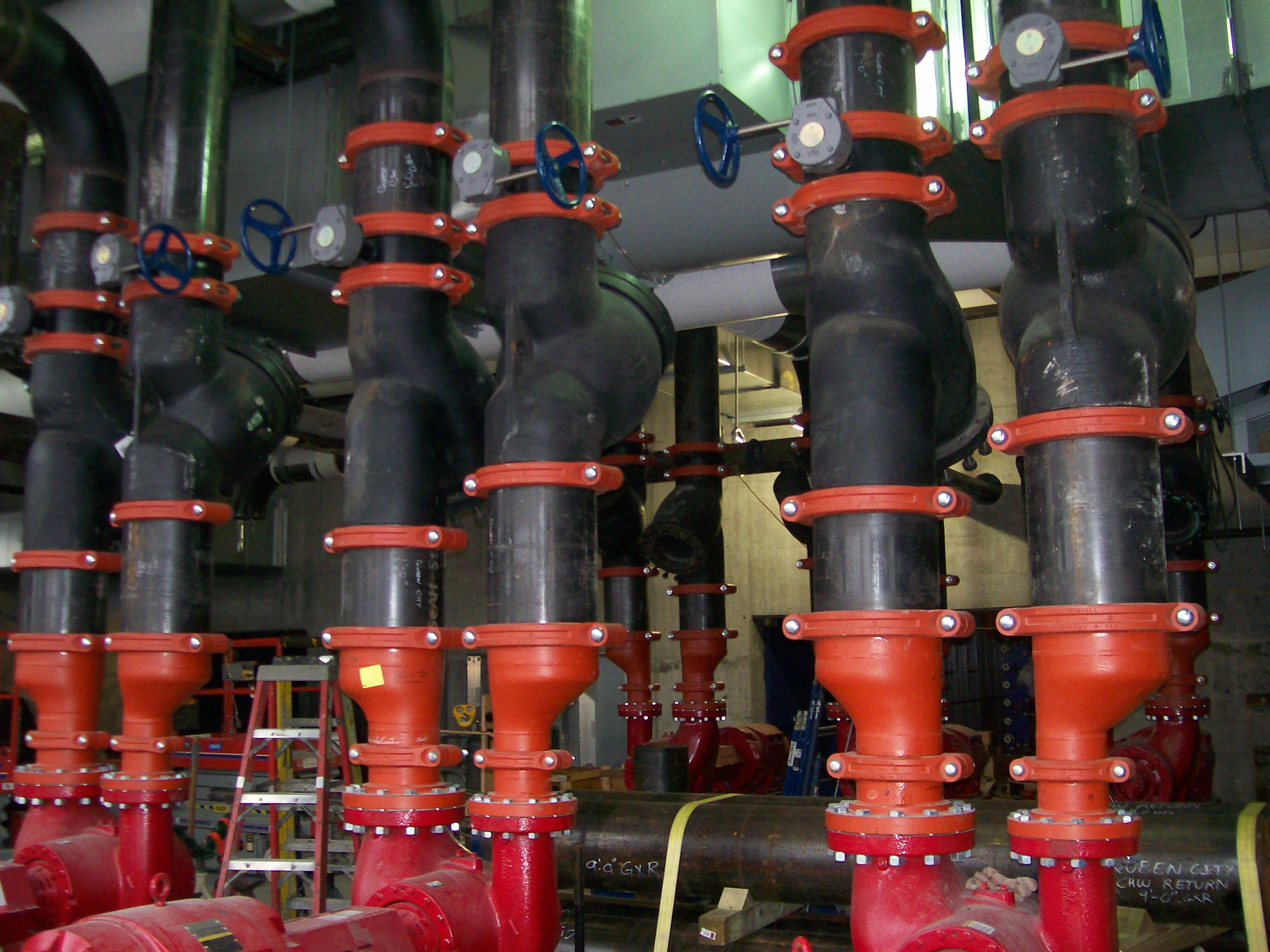
Grinnell Mechanical Products

=== Mechanical and Fire Products ===
Grinnell grooved products include grooved couplings, grooved fittings, mechanical tees, valves, circuit balancing valves, copper systems, stainless steel systems, plain end systems, HDPE systems, PVC systems, G-PRESS systems, gaskets and spare parts, and preparation equipment, as well as accessories, such as strainers, tee strainers, suction diffusers, dielectric waterway transition fittings, dielectric waterway groove threads, and dielectric waterway male threads. Grinnell grooved products have a 10-year limited warranty for most products, except for the G-MINE line of products, which are warranted for six months. The company’s fire protection products comprise rigid and flexible couplings, full and short pattern grooved elbows and tees, and a variety of valves and accessories.

=== Services ===
Grinnell Mechanical Services include shop drawings, pump assemblies and equipment connections, cost comparisons, crate and tag handling, thermal movement analyses, CAD blocks and families, and training services.

== History ==
=== Early history ===
The predecessor for Grinnell Corp. was Providence Steam and Gas pipe Co. founded in Providence Rhode Island in 1850. The company specialized in gas main installations, putting in the original gas mains in Rhode Island. They eventually grew to offer pipe fitting and plumbing services.

In 1869, Frederick Grinnell, a Massachusetts-born engineer, purchased a controlling interest in Providence Steam and Gas and became its president. Fire protection was a new science in this time period and depended on manually turning on the sprinklers. In 1874, Henry S. Parmelee of New Haven, Connecticut, patented an automatic sprinkling device, and four years later the Providence Steam and Gas Pipe Co. secured the right to manufacture and install it, paying royalties to the inventor. In 1881, Grinnell patented an improved, more sensitive sprinkling system.

Through the next few decades, Grinnell sprinklers were installed in thousands of buildings and were credited with saving thousands of lives. Frederick Grinnell took out some 40 patents for improvements and also invented a dry-pipe valve and automatic fire-alarm system. To improve the quality of its iron castings, General Fire Extinguisher established its own foundry and shops in Cranston, Rhode Island, opening the operation in 1909.

=== 1950–1970 ===
Grinnell acquired a controlling interest in American District Telegraph Co. (ADT Security Services), manufacturer of electrical supervisory and alarm systems for protection against fire, burglary, holdup, and other hazards. Further, Grinnell stock was trading at nearly triple the 1953 value.

At this time, Grinnell and its acquired subsidiaries held more than 87 percent of the central-station fire and burglar alarm business in the United States, according to the U.S. Justice Department. However, this field of business accounted for only about 20 percent of Grinnell's annual sales volume and profits, with plumbing supplies and fixtures being responsible for most of the rest. "We are major manufacturers of the valves and fittings that go into sprinkling systems, but that is not our biggest business," Fleming told a Forbes interviewer in 1965. "We also make industrial piping systems and humidifying systems. We are strictly an industrial supplier."

=== 1970–1990 ===
Grinnell's bottom line was so attractive that in December 1968 the giant conglomerate International Telephone & Telegraph (ITT) offered to acquire Grinnell for an exchange of stock valued at almost $250 million. Grinnell shareholders backed the merger in August 1969, despite the Justice Department's decision to oppose it on antitrust grounds. In 1971, a consent judgment required ITT to divest itself of Grinnell's fire-protection division and Grinnell's share in Hajoca by September 24, 1973.

When ITT was unable to receive what it considered an acceptable bid for the fire-protection unit the concern was turned over to a court-appointed trustee. Operating as Grinnell Fire Protection Systems Co., the unit, whose annual turnover had risen to $107 million, was purchased by Tyco Laboratories in 1976. As part of the deal with ITT, Tyco agreed to pay ITT $14 million and 40 percent of Grinnell's net earnings for the next 10 years, with a minimum total payment of $28.5 million guaranteed; in return, Tyco gained two manufacturing plants, plus other facilities, tools, equipment, patent rights, and trademarks.

=== 1990s ===
Grinnell grooved products became one of Tyco's leading manufacturing units. Going into the mid-1990s, Grinnell Corp. was actually a family of companies that included Grinnell Manufacturing, Grinnell Fire Protection, Grinnell Supply Sales, Ansul, Wormald, Mueller, Hersey, Allied, and Total Walther.

=== 2012 ===
Pentair valve and control through an all-stock merger, took operational control over the valve manufacturing and distribution from Grinnell Mechanical Products.

== Photo gallery ==
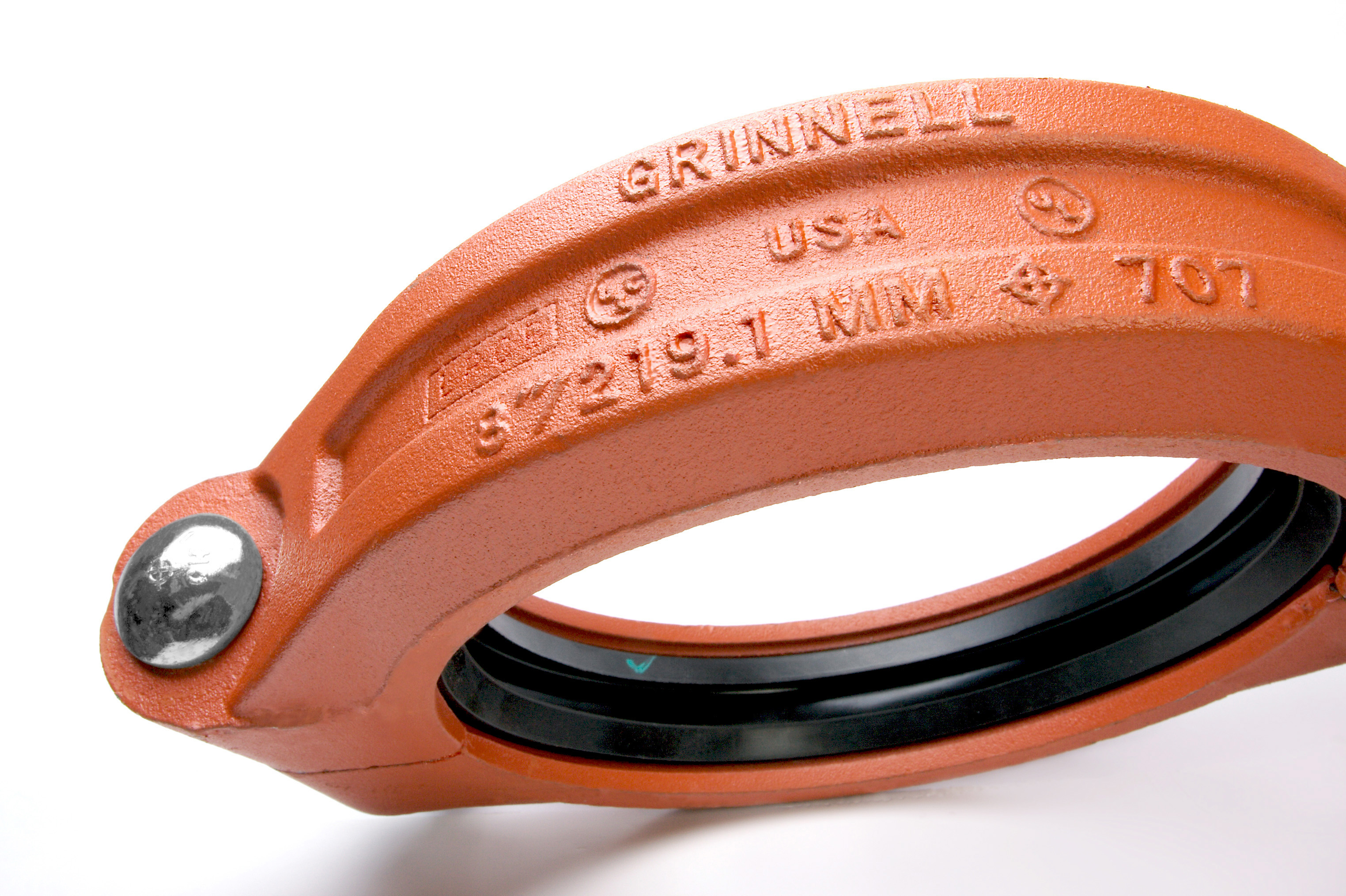
Grinnell Mechanical Products Coupling

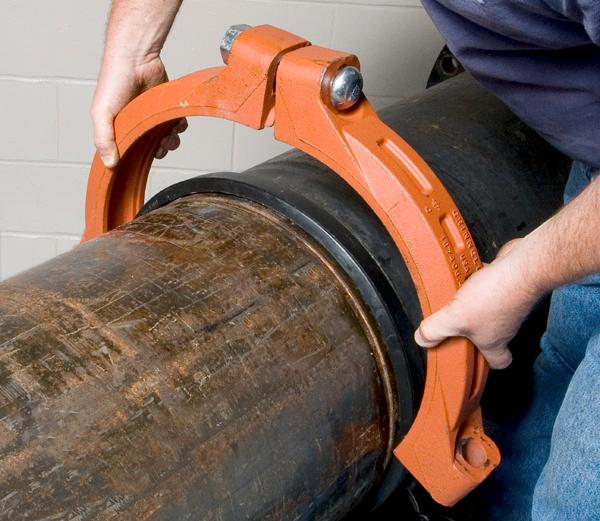
Grinnell Mechanical Products Installation

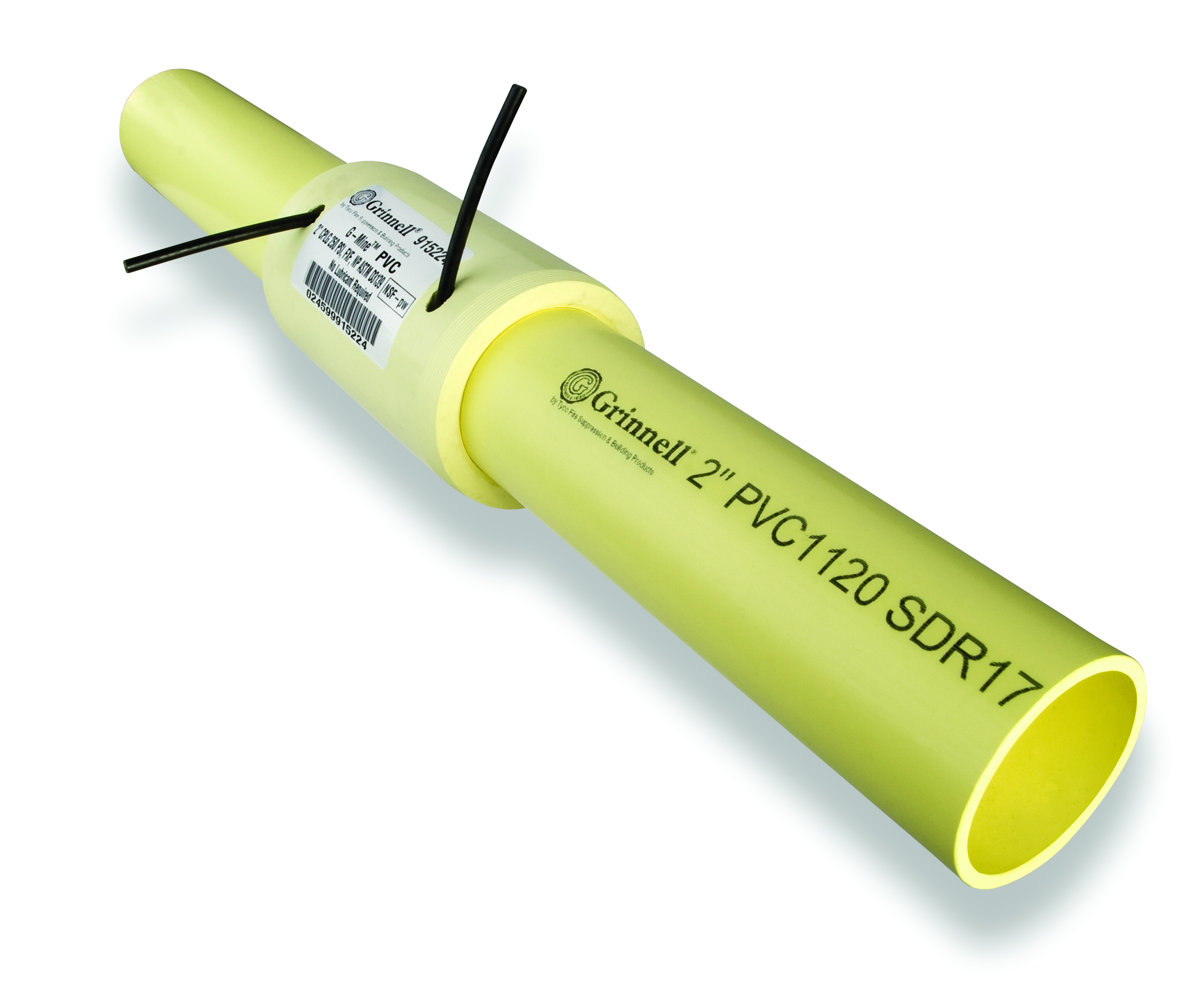
Grinnell Mechanical Products G-MINE

Grinnell Mechanical Products HVAC Installation

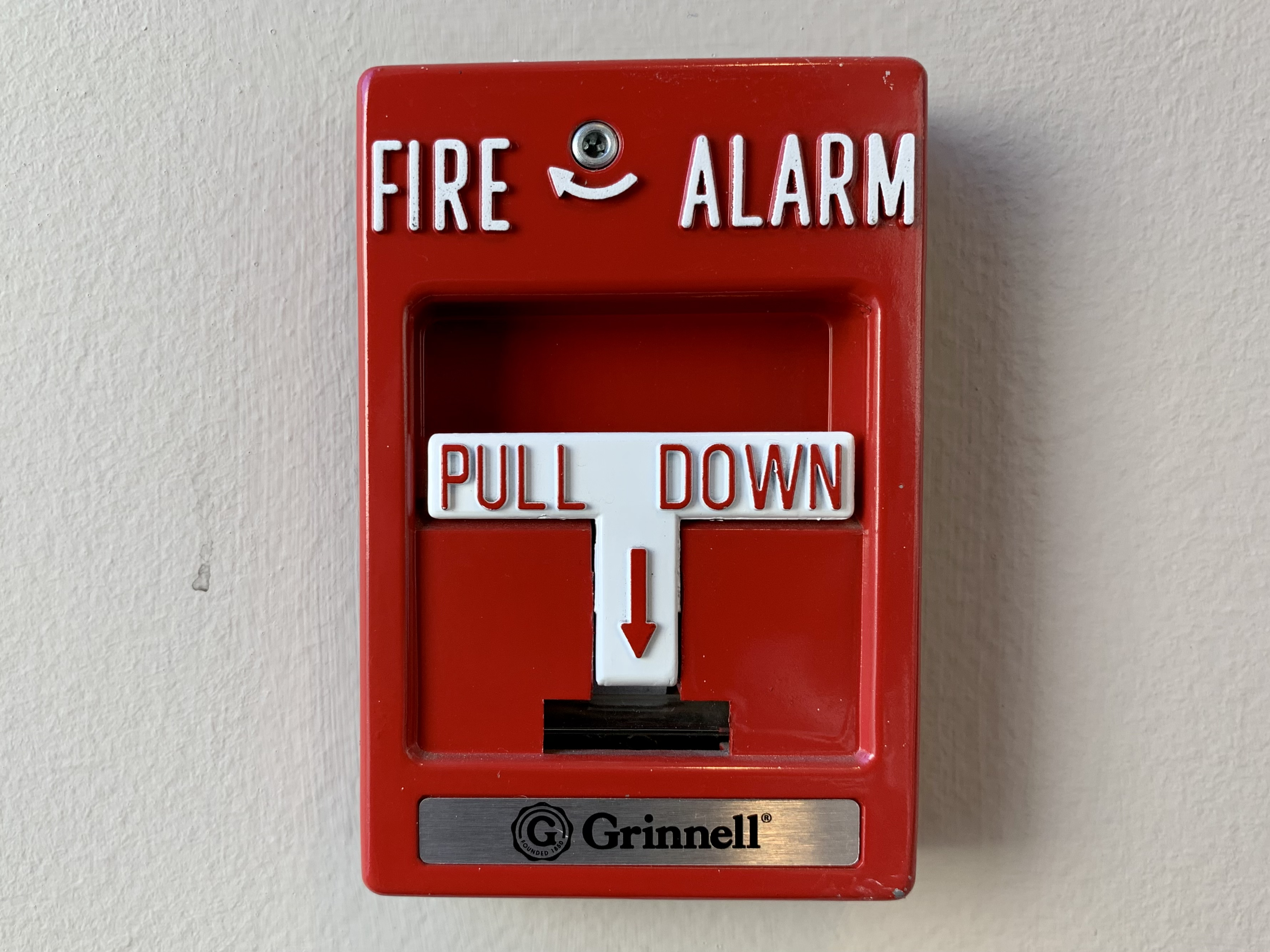
A Grinnell-branded fire alarm pull station
