= Sensormatic =

Security technology company

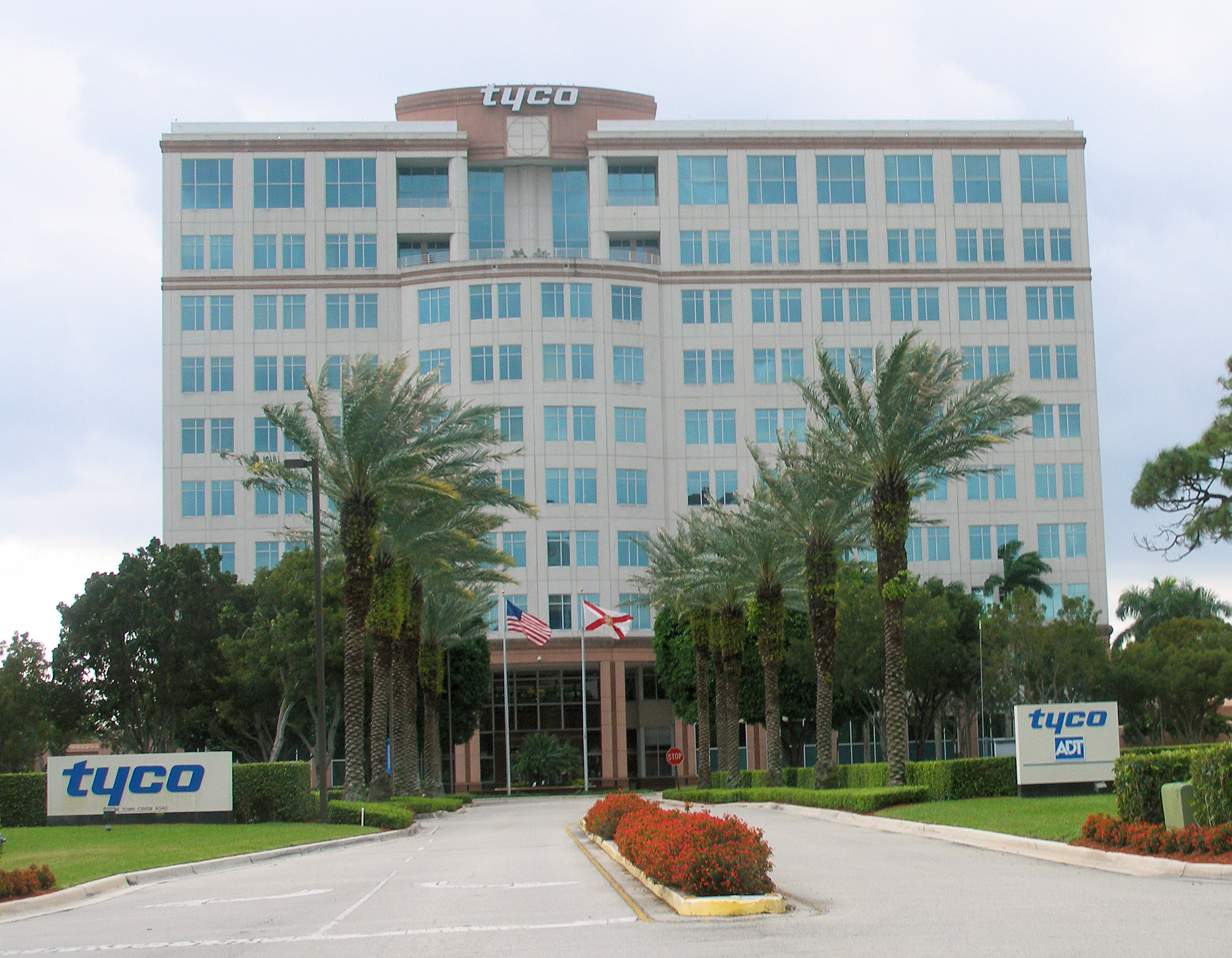
Tyco Fire & Security headquarters in Boca Raton (also home to Sensormatic)

Sensormatic is a subsidiary of Tyco International (now owned by Johnson Controls) that manufactures and sells electronic article surveillance equipment. They manufacture acusto-magnetic (AM) electronic article surveillance systems.

Sensormatic Electronics Corporation was purchased by Tyco International in 2001. The acquisition was executed by a merger of Sensormatic with a subsidiary of Tyco. Sensormatic is frequently called by the name of its parent company ADT, formerly ADT/Tyco.

A product from Sensormatic is the Supertag, a hard loss prevention tag. The Supertag took over for the Sensormatic Ultragator tag. Ultragator is a tan Ultra Max tag that is sold to retail companies. Ultragator tags were improved upon during the design of the Supertag.

Sensormatic specializes in the area of sourcetagging. A sourcetag is a security tag or label applied during the manufacturing process. Recently Sensormatic introduced disposable hard source tags at a few retail chains.

Johnson Controls announced the SuperTag 4 as part of the Sensormatic portfolio. The SuperTag 4 is an iteration of the SuperTag product.
