= Tyco International =

Irish-American company

Tyco International Ltd.

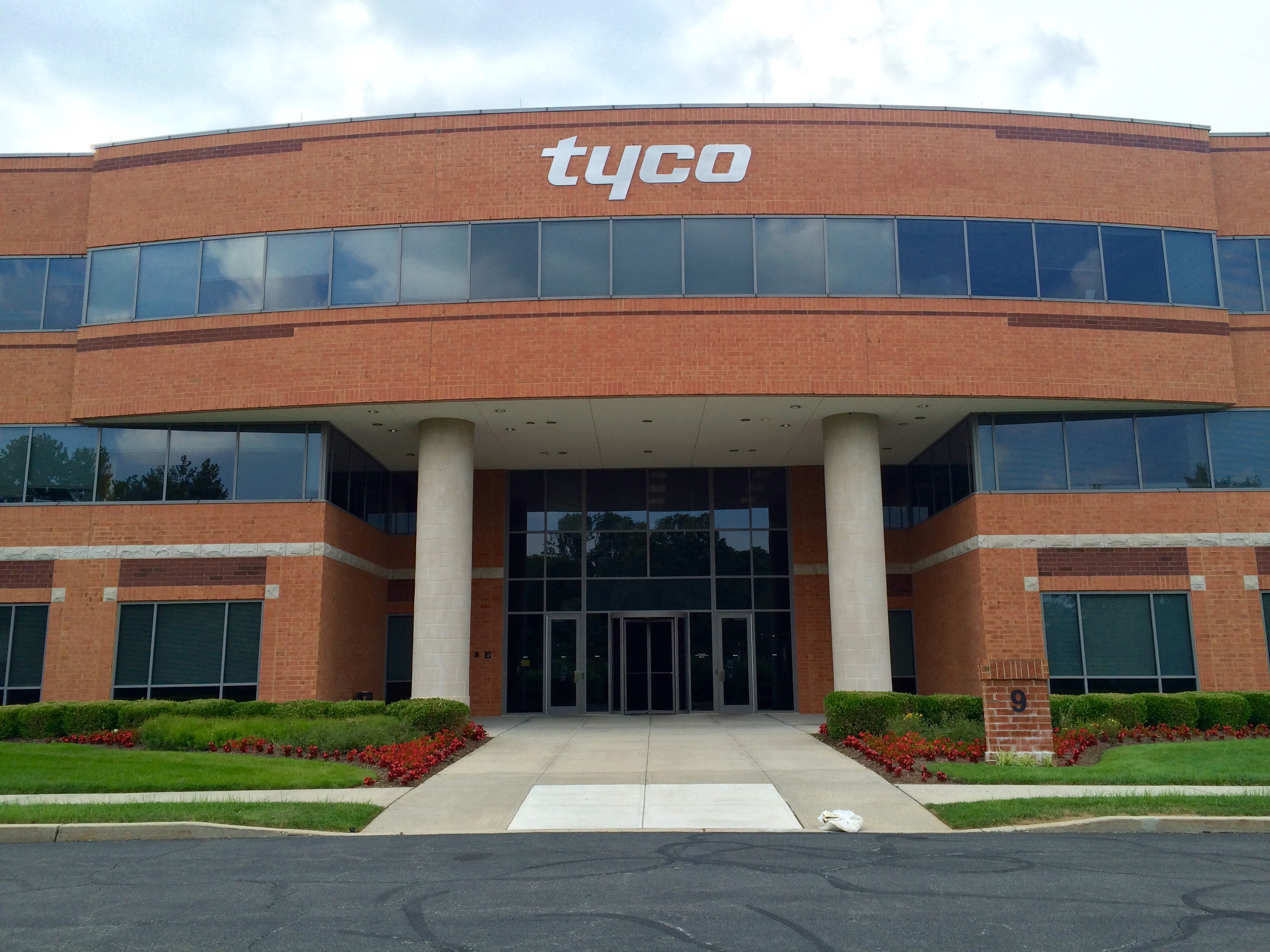
- Tyco International's former operational headquarters in Princeton, New Jersey.
- Formerly: Tyco, Inc. (1969–1965); Tyco Laboratories, Inc. (1965–1993); Tyco International Limited (1993–2014)
- Type: Public
- Traded as: NYSE: TYC
- Industry: Security
- Founded: 1960; 66 years ago
- Founder: Arthur J. Rosenberg
- Defunct: September 6, 2016
- Fate: Merged with Johnson Controls (as of September 9, 2016)
- Successor: Johnson Controls International plc
- Headquarters: Incorporation: Cork, Ireland; Operational/Corporate: Princeton, New Jersey, United States (prior to merger with Johnson Controls)
- Key people: George R. Oliver (CEO); Edward D. Breen (Chairman)
- Products: Security Solutions, Fire Protection
- Revenue: ▲US$17.36 billion (2011)
- Operating income: ▲US$2,119 million (2011)
- Net income: ▲US$1,733 million (2011)
- Number of employees: 69,000 (2011)
- Website: www.tyco.com

Tyco International was a security systems company incorporated in Ireland, with operational headquarters in Princeton, New Jersey, United States (Tyco International (US) Inc.). Tyco International was composed of two major business segments: security solutions and fire protection.

On January 25, 2016, Johnson Controls announced it would merge with Tyco, and all businesses of Tyco and Johnson Controls would be combined under Tyco International plc, to be renamed as Johnson Controls International plc. The merger was completed on September 9, 2016.

== Timeline ==
=== 1960s ===
Founded by Arthur J. Rosenberg in 1960, Tyco, Inc. was formed as an investment and holding company with two segments: Tyco Semiconductors and The Materials Research Laboratory. In the first two years of operation, the company focused primarily on governmental research and military experiments in the private sector.

In 1962, the business was incorporated in Massachusetts and refocused on high-tech materials science and energy conservation products. Two years later in 1964, the company went public and began to fill gaps in its development and distribution network by acquiring Mule Battery Products, the first of Tyco's 16 acquisitions in the next four years.

=== 1970s ===
In the 1970s, Tyco boomed, beginning the decade with consolidated sales and stockholder equity reaching $34 million and $15 million, respectively.

In 1974, Tyco was listed on the New York Stock Exchange (NYSE).

By the end of the decade, Tyco had a larger and more diverse corporation with sales topping $500 million and a net worth of nearly $140 million. Tyco's success was largely attributed to ambitious acquisitions of Simplex Technology, Grinnell Fire Protection Systems, Armin Plastics and the Ludlow Corporation.

=== 1980s ===
Following aggressive acquisition period through the 1970s, Tyco management focused the early 1980s on organizing its newly acquired subsidiaries. Tyco divided the company into three business segments, Fire Protection, Electronics, and Packaging, and implemented strategies to achieve significant market share in each of Tyco's product lines.

Once organized, Tyco returned to the strategy of growth by acquisition in the later part of the decade acquiring Grinnell Corporation, Allied Tube and Conduit, and the Mueller Company. Tyco then again reorganized its subsidiaries into four segments: Electrical and Electronic Components, Healthcare and Specialty Products, Fire and Security Services and Flow Control. This reorganization remained in place until 2007 when current CEO Ed Breen spun off the Electrical and Healthcare segments to create three publicly independent companies.

=== 1990s ===
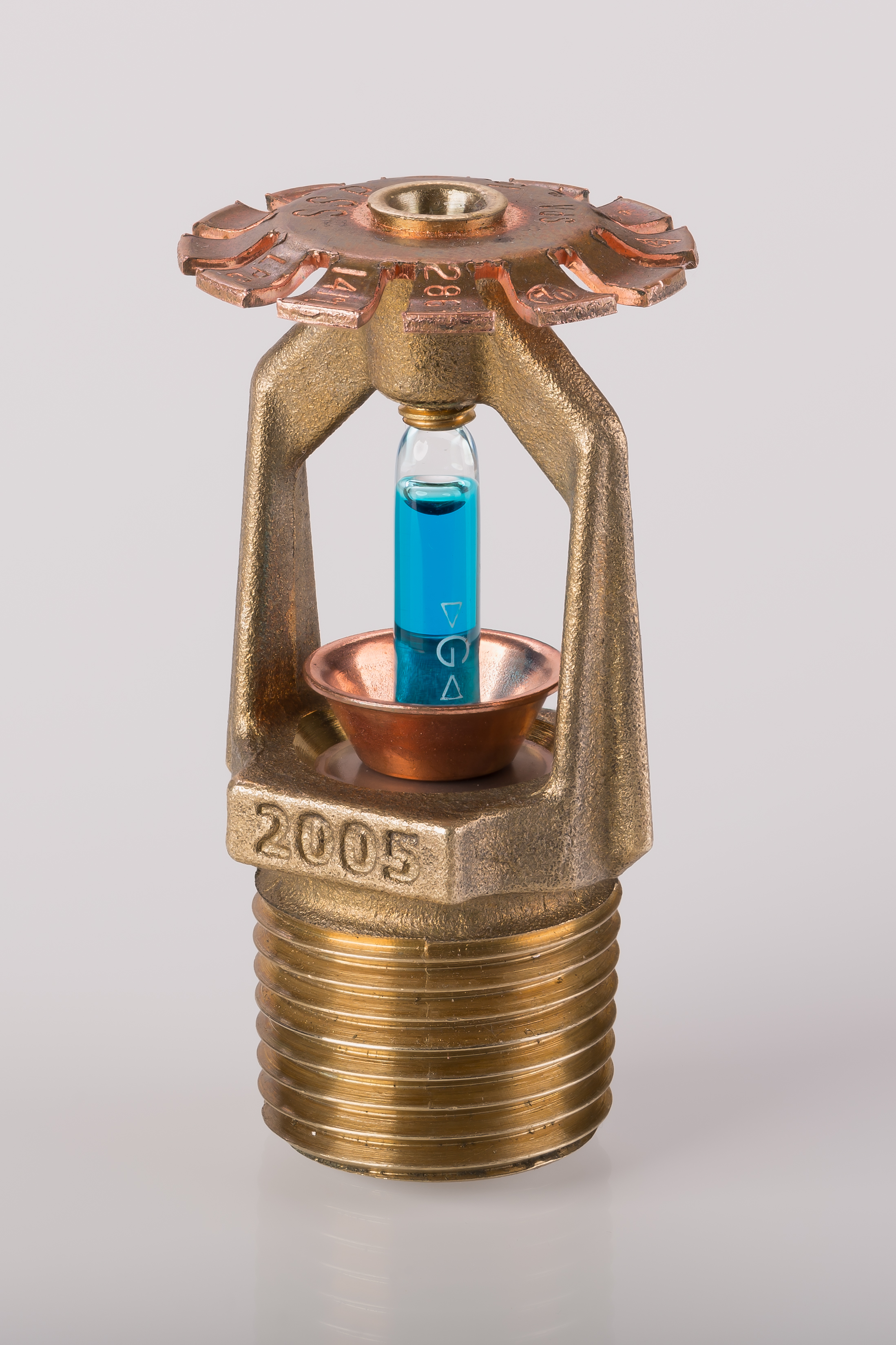
A TYCO Standard Spray Sprinkler head

In 1992, Dennis Kozlowski became CEO of Tyco International, and, for the next several years, the company again adopted an aggressive acquisition strategy, eventually acquiring (by some accounts) over 3,000 other companies between 1991 and 2001.

Major acquisitions in the 1990s included: Wormald International Limited, Neotecha, Hindle/Winn, Classic Medical, Uni-Patch, Promeon, Preferred Pipe, Kendall International Co., Tectron Tube, Unistrut, Earth Technology Corporation, Professional Medical Products, Inc., Thorn Security, Carlisle, Watts Waterworks Businesses, Sempell, ElectroStar, American Pipe & Tube, Submarine Systems Inc., Keystone, INBRAND, Sherwood Davis & Geck, United States Surgical, Wells Fargo Alarm, AMP, Raychem, Glynwed, Temasa and Central Sprinkler designs.

To reflect Tyco's global presence following the abundant acquisitions, the company's name was changed from Tyco Laboratories, Inc. to Tyco International Ltd. in 1993. In addition, Tyco launched The Pipeline, an internal employee newsletter; the title was later changed to Tyco World. Its final issue was published in April–May 2006.

In 1996, Tyco was added to the Standard & Poor's S&P 500 Composite Index, which consists of the 500 publicly traded companies in the United States with the largest market capitalization.

In 1997, Tyco acquired AT&T Submarine Systems, gaining research and development and fleet assets, along with the manufacturing capability to produce repeaters and transmission equipment. These additional capabilities, combined with cable manufacturing at Tyco Integrated Cables Systems in Newington, New Hampshire, established Tyco Telecommunications as the world's first vertically integrated global optical network supplier, capable of developing the technology and manufacturing the components, to designing, building and maintaining systems.

In July 1997, Tyco merged by reverse takeover with a smaller publicly traded security services company named ADT Limited, controlled by Michael Ashcroft. As part of the deal, Tyco International Ltd. of Massachusetts became a wholly owned subsidiary of ADT Limited, and simultaneously ADT changed its name to Tyco International Ltd., retaining the former Tyco stock symbol, TYC. The merger moved Tyco's incorporation to Bermuda, a tax haven, where it was headquartered in the colonial capital of Hamilton. A new subsidiary named ADT Security Systems was also formed out of the merger, and later changed its name to ADT Security Services.

In 1999, Tyco acquired two S&P 500 companies in a buyout. They acquired the electronics connector manufacturer AMP Inc., for $12.22 billion and a materials science company, Raychem Corp., for $1.4 billion.

=== 2000s ===
==== 2000–2001 ====
Tyco's aggressive acquisition strategy continued into the early 2000s, with the purchases of General Surgical Innovations, Siemens Electromechanical Components, AFC Cable and Praegitzer. The additions gave Tyco an ending fiscal 2000 year revenue exceeding $28 billion, nearly $2 billion coming from the sale by a subsidiary of its common shares.

In the fiscal 2000 year, Tyco acquired Mallinckrodt Inc, a subsidiary of United States Surgical Corporation and Simplex Time Recorder Company which it merged in January 2002 with Grinnell Fire Protection to form an indirect wholly owned subsidiary, SimplexGrinnell LP, the world's largest fire protection company. For the year ended September 2000, the company's book value exceeded $141 billion. However, the company more than doubled its long-term debt, by over $80 billion. "Mallinckrodt US LLC, is completely separate from Mallinckrodt Pharmaceuticals. Mallinckrodt US LLC is a subsidiary of United States Surgical Corporation, and an affiliate of Medtronic plc, the ultimate parent company of both entities".

In October 2001, the Engineered Products and Services segment acquired Century Tube Corp, and followed it by buying Water & Power Technologies in November 2001. The following November, the Tyco Electronics segment acquired Transpower Technologies. The next month, the Plastics and Adhesives segment acquired LINQ Industrial Fabrics, Inc.

==== Early 2002 ====
With complexity growing within Tyco's subsidiaries, in January 2002, Tyco announced a plan to split the business into four separate companies. However, this plan was abandoned after a downgrade in its credit rating and a significant drop in its stock price.

Later that month, Tyco's acquisitions continued throughout all of its segments: the Electronics segment acquired Communications Instruments, Inc. The Healthcare segment bought Paragon Trade Brands, a contract manufacturer of private label baby diapers for North American retailers such as Wal-Mart, Kmart, Albertsons, Sobeys, Zellers, etc. The Engineered Products and Services segment acquired Clean Air Systems. And the Fire and Security segment of Tyco acquired SBC/Smith Alarm Systems, DSC Group, and Sensormatic Electronics Corp.

For all the acquisitions Tyco made in 2002, the company also incurred extensive losses. During the first quarter of 2002, following the recession of the previous year, the electronics segment recorded a charge of over $2 billion, related to massive overcapacity of fiber-optic cable, which in turn affected the in-process buildout of Tyco's global undersea fiber-optic network, known as Tyco Global Network (TGN). TGN generated a loss for fiscal 2002 of over $3 billion, with a restructuring charge of over $500 million. Construction of TGN was eventually completed in 2003.

The electronics segment also recorded over $1 billion in restructuring charges in 2002 from inventory write-down and facility closures. In addition, 2002 struck Tyco with two goodwill impairments, the first for over $500 million in the second quarter, due to their fiber-cable overcapacity issue and other corporate problems. The second, costing the electronics segment $250 million related to sales issues in Power Systems, Electrical Contracting Services, and the Printed Circuit Group. To make Tyco's financial matters worse, the company lost over a quarter of $1 billion in investment during 2002 in FLAG Telecom Holdings Ltd.

In an effort to cut losses, on July 8, 2002, Tyco divested its Tyco Capital business through an initial public offering, with the sale of 100% of the common shares in CIT Group. It recorded the CIT divestment as discontinued operations for 2002, taking a $6 billion loss, and as an almost $7 billion impairment charge. That month, the Tyco Healthcare segment also divested Surgical Dynamics, Inc.

For the year ended September 2002, Tyco revenue rose to nearly $35 billion. However, it suffered more than a $9 billion loss that year, which included the asset impairment write-down of TGN by over $3 billion, losses of nearly $2 billion for the two restructuring charges, and over $1 billion from the two goodwill impairment charges. In all, the net charges totaled nearly $7 billion of the loss that year. The stock price plummeted.

To add to the financial woes of the company, midway through the fiscal 2002 year, Tyco became embroiled in a massive scandal involving the excesses by its former chairman and CEO, L. Dennis Kozlowski, and his senior management team. Kozlowski resigned and former Tyco CEO John F. Fort became interim CEO until the board of directors completed a search for a permanent replacement. Early 2002, Tyco was alleged in violation of the Securities Exchange Act of 1934 by nondisclosure of major financial information and artificially inflating its earnings. On June 17, 2002, Tyco filed federal suit against Mark H. Swartz, Tyco's former executive vice president and chief corporate counsel, and Frank E. Walsh, a former director.

==== Late 2002 ====
In July 2002, Edward D. Breen was appointed president, CEO, and chairman of Tyco for an initial three-year term. Breen had previously been president and COO of Motorola since his promotion at that company in January 2002.

Breen made an immediate impact on Tyco by gutting the existing board of directors and leadership team that worked with Kozlowski and replacing them with a new set of managers. One month after his appointment, Tyco announced the appointment of John Krol as lead director of the board of directors with the priority of improving Tyco's corporate governance.

Breen made additional changes, appointing David FitzPatrick as Executive Vice President and CFO, William Lytton, Executive Vice President and General Counsel, and Eric Pillmore as Senior Vice President of Corporate Governance.

With a new management team in place, Tyco began a two-phase internal investigation of former CEO Kozlowski. The investigation led to Tyco filing two federal lawsuits. On September 12 and December 6, 2002, Tyco filed a federal suit against Kozlowski and an arbitration claim against former CFO and director, Mark H. Swartz. Swartz, however, failed to submit to the American Arbitration Association and Tyco followed with a federal suit against him.

At the same time, the Securities and Exchange Commission filed civil fraud charges against Dennis Kozlowski, Mark H. Swartz and chief legal officer Mark A. Belnick.

On November 27, 2002, the State of New Jersey took action in the scandal, filing a federal suit against Tyco and former personnel, with charges in part of violating the New Jersey Racketeer Influenced and Corrupt Organizations Act (RICO) statute, stemming from the Kozlowski scandal.

As a result of the scandal, Tyco and some former directors and officers were named as defendants in more than two dozen securities class-action lawsuits. Most of the cases were consolidated and transferred to the United States District Court for the District of New Hampshire and filed by court-appointed lead plaintiffs on January 28, 2003, as the case In Re Tyco International Securities Litigation, citing causes of action under the Securities Act of 1933 and the Securities Exchange Act of 1934. That March 31, Tyco made a motion to dismiss, which was granted in part over a year later, on October 14, 2004.

==== 2003 ====
On February 3, 2003, the scandal continued to play out in the courts, Tyco and more personnel were again named as defendants in an amended consolidated class-action federal suit brought on behalf of retirees in its Retirement Savings and Investment Plans, citing causes under the Employee Retirement Income Security Act. On December 2, 2004, the New Hampshire court granted in part Tyco's motion to dismiss.

Removed from the scandal, Tyco made internal moves within the company in 2003 forming its Plastics & Adhesives business segment, a former piece of the Healthcare & Specialty Products segment. Other changes came in Tyco's corporate governance: Tyco's board re-elected John Krol as lead director, Tyco reorganized the assignments of the board's committee, adopted a new board of governance principles and new Delegation of Authority policy which strengthened control over cash disbursements within the company.

The final improvement on corporate governance came in the Guide to Ethical Conduct. The guide was produced to advise employees as to correct procedures and warn of unethical practices and behavior. All Tyco employees are now required to take a brief ethics course and sign an annual ethics statement.

==== 2004 ====
In an effort to enhance consumer awareness and revive corporate image, in June 2004, Tyco launched a new global print-advertising campaign, "Tyco a vital part of your world." Tyco also began a divestiture program following a review of its core businesses. Part of the plan was to sell TGN, which by then had been entirely written off in value. Agreement for the sale was reached in November.

In the second quarter of 2004, ADT Security sold off Sonitrol.

In all, within its divestiture program, by fiscal year end of 2004, Tyco had divested 21 businesses and liquidated four non-core businesses, primarily within the Fire and Security segment.

In September 2004, Tyco also divested Electrical Contracting Services from the electronics segment, due to a decrease in sales. After September 30, Tyco divested an additional seven non-core businesses, bringing the program aggregate proceeds up to $500 million that year.

By the end of 2004, Tyco employed under 260,000 people, with two-thirds outside the United States. Revenue was up strongly, to over $40 billion for the first time. Once again the strengthening euro against the dollar helped Tyco, accounting primarily for $1.5 billion of the increase in revenue. Various charges, losses, and debt repayment totaled nearly $1 billion in 2004, however, profitability tripled that year to almost $3 billion.

==== 2005 ====
Videsh Sanchar Nigam Limited (VSNL), India acquired the Tyco Global Network (TGN) from Tyco International for $130 million. The chief stockholder in VSNL is India's Tata Group, also one of India's largest conglomerates. It was once valued at $3 billion during the telecommunications bubble.

Tyco continued its divestiture program throughout 2005. The largest divestiture came in the announcement of a definitive agreement to sell its Plastics, Adhesives and Ludlow Coated Products businesses to an affiliate of private investment firm Apollo Management, L.P. Tyco believed the segment no longer fit within the company's portfolio.

Tyco was awarded the largest statewide public safety communications project in the United States in 2004 when one of Tyco Electronics' businesses, M/A-COM Technology Solutions, signed a contract to maintain New York's Statewide Wireless Network (SWN). The contract was worth approximately $2 billion and would last for 20 years.

Tyco also acquired two key companies to its Healthcare segment, Vivant Medical Inc. and Floréane Medical Implants.

==== 2006–2007 ====
On February 16, 2006, a group of institutional investors, part of an existing lawsuit against Tyco International, sued the company to stop its proposed breakup plan.

By the end of the fiscal year 2006, Tyco's revenue had eclipsed $17 billion. Despite the strong cash flow, growing revenue and decreased debt, Tyco and its board of directors approved a plan to separate Tyco into three publicly independent companies. Tyco believed that this would allow for each segment to perform better within its particular market and create more value for its shareholders.

The separation was completed in July 2007, when Tyco separated into three publicly independent companies:

- Covidien Ltd. (formerly Tyco Healthcare)
- Tyco Electronics Ltd. (now TE Connectivity)
- Tyco International Ltd. (formerly Tyco Fire & Security and Tyco Engineered Products & Services (TFS/TEPS))

Following the separation, chairman and CEO Ed Breen remained at the head of Tyco International, which was then composed of five major business segments: ADT Worldwide, Fire Protection Services, Safety Products, Flow Control and Electrical and Metal Products. The company generated revenue of $18.8 billion in 2007, and employed 118,000 people across all 50 states and in more than 60 countries.

=== 2010s ===
==== 2010 ====
Tyco filed against Kozlowski, asserting that the $500 million in compensation and benefits he received during his time of disloyalty, between 1997 and 2002, were forfeit under New York's "faithless servant" doctrine. Southern District of New York Judge Thomas Griesa concluded in 2010 that under the faithless servant doctrine, Kozlowski must forfeit all compensation and benefits he earned during his period of disloyalty.

In March, Tyco Telecommunications was renamed to Tyco Electronics Subsea Communication.

==== 2011–2012 ====
Logo of Visonic, which Tyco acquired for $100 million in 2011

Tyco International announced in January 2011 that it was acquiring Brink's Home Security Holdings (operating as Broadview Security) in a transaction valued at $2.0 billion. It was reported that Broadview Security would merge into Tyco's ADT Security Services division.

In 2011, Tyco acquired Visonic, a developer and manufacturer of home security alarm systems and components, for $100 million. Visonic was established in 1973 by the brothers Moshe and Yaacov Kotlicki. Visonic had an initial public offering on the London Stock Exchange in 2004 with a valuation of $65 million and removed in 2010 from the LSE. In June 2006, Visonic shares were traded on the Tel Aviv Stock Exchange.

In September 2011, Tyco International's directors announced plans to split the company once again, separating the company's Flow Control business, North America's residential security business and its international fire and security business in a plan that Chief Executive Ed Breen described as: "the best path to create long-term shareholder value."

The separation was completed on October 1, 2012, resulting in the following companies being created:

- Tyco: focused on fire protection and electronic security products, installation and services worldwide.
- The ADT Corporation in North America: focused on residential and small business security installation and services in North America.
- Flow Control: focused on water and fluid solutions, valves and controls, and equipment protection products worldwide. This business merged with Pentair Inc. and was part of Pentair Valve and Controls business in 2012. This Pentair division was then acquired by Emerson Electric in 2017.

Tyco retained use of the ADT brand for security installation and services outside of North America. ADT's commercial security installation and services business in North America was rebranded and became Tyco Integrated Security. Tyco had over 70,000 employees worldwide, operating in nearly 50 countries and serving over three million customers.

In September 2012, Tyco was accused of violation of the Foreign Corrupt Practices Act (FCPA) and agreed to a payment of around $13 million in civil penalties to the U.S. Securities and Exchange Commission.

==== 2013 ====
In November 2013, Tyco approached various private equity firms offering to sell its Korean security unit, Caps Co.

==== 2014 ====
In February 2014, US private equity firm Carlyle Group entered into talks with Tyco to acquire its South Korean security systems unit, valued at around $2 billion.

In 2014, Tyco International sold its New Zealand based security company Armourguard Security limited to Evergreen International, The cost of the sale is yet to be released.

==== 2016 ====
On January 25, 2016, Johnson Controls announced it would merge with Tyco, and all businesses of Tyco and Johnson Controls would be combined under Tyco International plc, to be renamed as Johnson Controls International plc. The merger was completed on September 9, 2016.

== Corporate scandal of 2002 ==
Former chairman and chief executive Dennis Kozlowski and former chief financial officer Mark H. Swartz were accused of the theft of more than US$150 million from the company. During their trial in March 2004, they contended the board of directors authorized it as compensation.

During jury deliberations, juror Ruth Jordan, while passing through the courtroom, appeared to make an "okay" sign on the table. She later denied she had intended that gesture, but the incident received much publicity (including a caricature in the Wall Street Journal), and the juror received threats after her name became public. Judge Michael Obus declared a mistrial on April 4, 2004.

On June 17, 2005, after a retrial, Kozlowski and Swartz were convicted on all but one of the more than 30 counts against them. The verdicts carry potential jail terms of up to 25 years in state prison. Kozlowski and Swartz were each sentenced to no less than eight years and four months and no more than 25 years in prison. Then in May 2007, New Hampshire Federal District Court Judge Paul Barbadoro approved a class action settlement whereby Tyco agreed to pay $2.92 billion (in conjunction with $225 million by Pricewaterhouse Coopers, their auditors) to a class of defrauded shareholders represented by Grant & Eisenhofer P.A., Schiffrin, Barroway, Topaz & Kessler, and Milberg Weiss & Bershad.

On January 17, 2014, Kozlowski was granted parole from Lincoln Correctional Facility in New York City.

== Net revenues by year ==
Year	2011	2010	2009	2008	2007	2006	2005	2004	2003	2002	2001	2000	1999	1998	1997
Revenue (in US$ Billion)	$17.3	$17.0	$17.2	$20.2	$18.5*	$41.0	$39.3	$38.0	$36.8	$35.6	$34.0	$28.9	$22.5	$19.1	$6.6

* Denotes the year of Tyco's separation into three publicly independent companies.

== Products ==
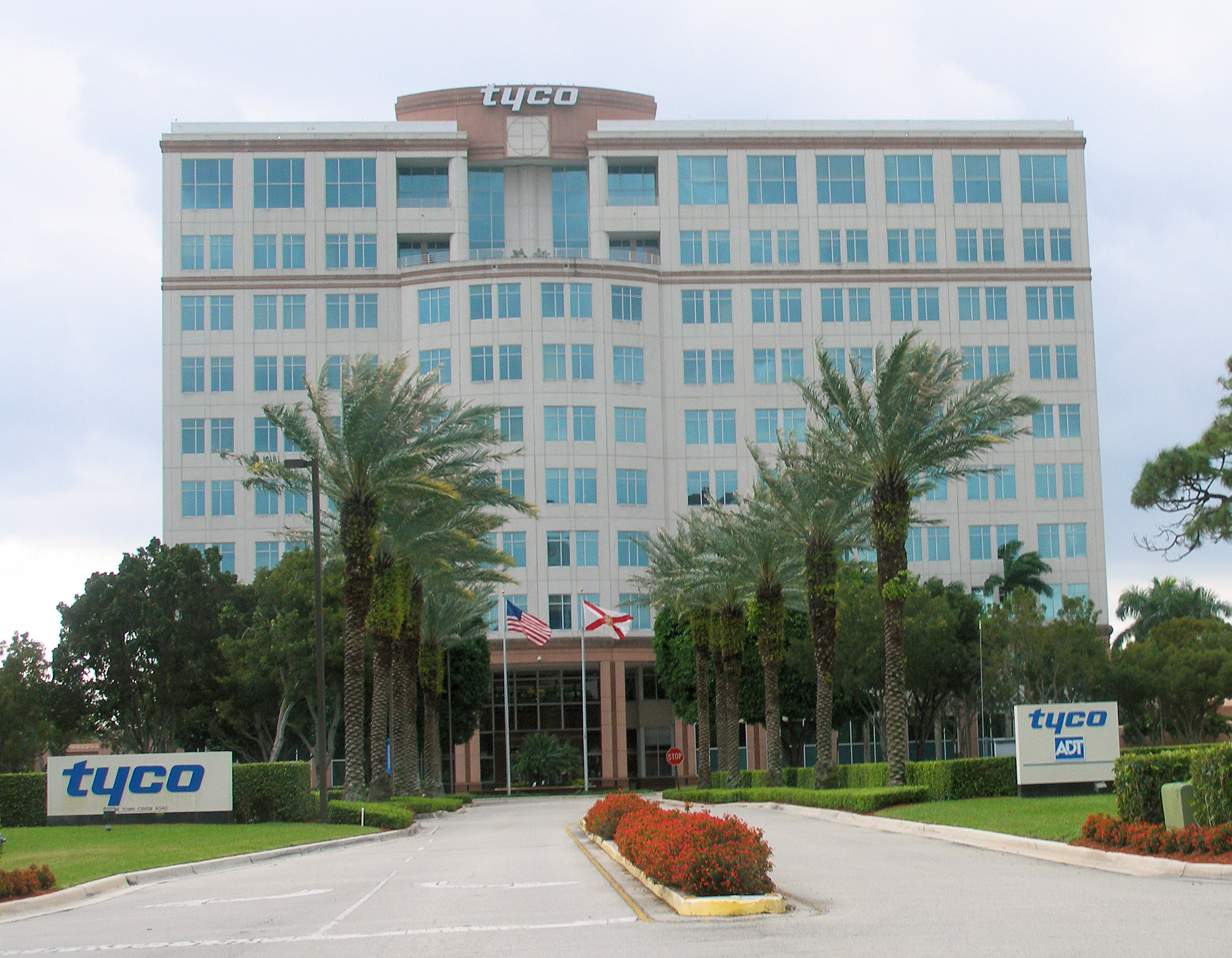
Tyco Fire & Security headquarters in Boca Raton (also home to Sensormatic and SimplexGrinnell)

Some of the many products made by Tyco included:

- CCTV/Access Control Equipment (Tyco Integrated Security, American Dynamics, Kantech, Software House, CEM Systems)
- Circuit protection devices
- EAS (electronic article surveillance) & RFID (radio frequency identification) products (Sensormatic)
- Engineering services
- Fire alarm systems (Simplex, Tyco Integrated Security)
- Fire sprinklers (SimplexGrinnell, Wormald)
- Fire-fighting hardware (Scott Safety) and Fire-fighting foam concentrates (Ansul, Chemguard, Skum, Total Walther, and Sabo)
- GRINNELL Grooved Products
- Safety products (including industrial-site safety & personal protective equipment (PPE) SCOTT Safety)
- Security systems (Tyco Integrated Security, ADT, DSC)
- Physical Security Information Management (Proximex)
- Valves and controls
  - Pressure-relief valves for nuclear power generation

== Environmental record ==
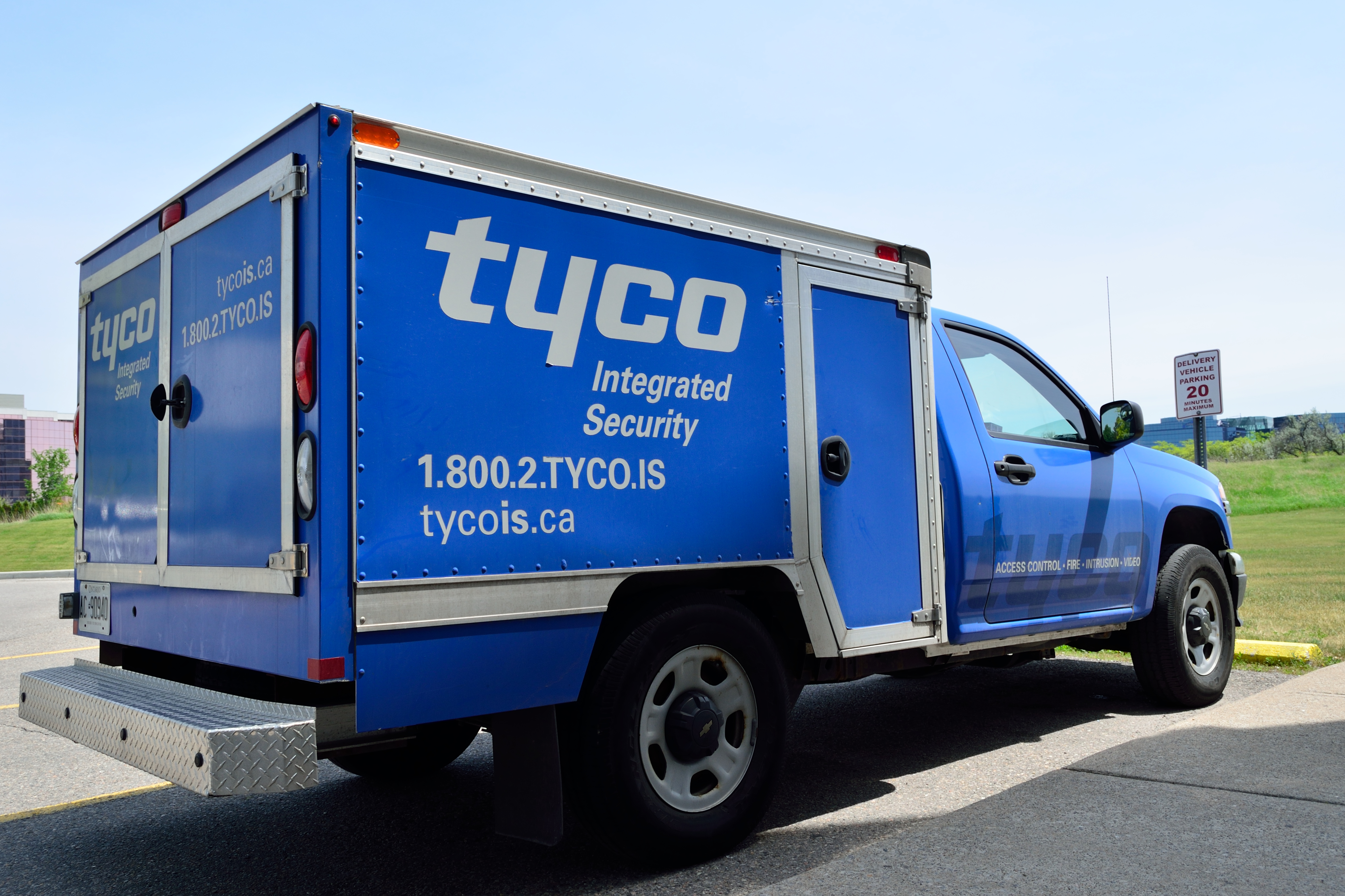
A Tyco vehicle.

Due to the Clean Air Act (CAA), Tyco International (US) Inc. was fined over $1.1 million for its previous metal forming and finishing facility in Hamburg, New Jersey because it failed to comply with requirements under CAA regulations. The facility, which Tyco operated from 1963 to 2000, used trichloroethylene to degrease chromium to metal parts, which are among some of the most toxic, dangerous air pollutants that could cause serious health effects.

In regards to the Clean Water Act, a health and safety manager from Enfield, Connecticut, was sentenced guilty on August 5, 2002, for deliberately routing wastewater produced in one of Tyco's manufacturing facilities around a sand filter; it was supposed to remove impurities from the wastewater before discharging into the Manchester sewers. The company used this bypass in order to accelerate production and lessen use of the waste treatment system. However, the wastewater discharged from the factory exceeded the levels of copper and lead, which were both toxic metals and could have led to harmful effects if passed through sewage treatment plants.

Tyco Printed Circuit Group (TPCG) of Stamford, Connecticut, was sentenced on 12 counts of violating the Clean Water Act in August 2004. The plea agreement called for TPCG to pay a total of $10 million in fines. Of that amount, $6 million was paid as a federal criminal fine; $2.7 million went to the Connecticut Department of Environmental Protection's (DEP) natural resources fund; the Towns of Stafford and Manchester received $500,000 each to fund improvements in their sewer and water treatment system; and $300,000 was paid for recycling deionized and other wastewater at the company's Stafford, Staffordville facilities. Between 1999 and June 2001, TPCG managers at the company's Stafford, Staffordville and Manchester facilities engaged in a variety of practices that caused the facilities to discharge wastewater with higher than permitted levels of pollutants into municipal sewage treatment systems. The illegal practices included, but were not limited to, diluting potentially non-compliant wastewater samples, discarding samples with excessive levels of toxic metals, and omitting samples that were not in compliance for pH. Daniel R. Callahan, the former Director of Environmental Health and Safety of Stafford Division of Tyco Printed Circuit Group, pleaded guilty to violating the Clean Water Act on November 17, 2003. Callahan falsified reports submitted to the Connecticut Department of Environmental Protection (DEP). The reports failed to include the fact that a "batch tank" had been discharged into the Manchester public sewer system. Tyco's DEP permit required that all discharges into public sewer systems be reported. Tyco was 41st on the 2002 Political Economy Research Institute's (PERI) Toxic 100.

When Tyco acquired Ansul, it also became responsible for the arsenic salt contamination to their local environment.

== Restatement ==
On June 26, 2000, the company restated some figures in 1999 annual report to shareholders. On October 18, 2001, the company adopted the provisions of SAB 101, related to revenue recognition, in the fourth quarter of fiscal 2001, results in the first three quarters of fiscal 2001 be restated. On October 24, 2002, the company restated its earnings for earlier in the year 2002 because of questions raised in an internal audit over it how it accounted for dealer fees involving its ADT home security systems business. On June 16, 2003, the company restated several years of financial results in connection with securities regulators' previously announced review of its filings.
