= Ansul Fire School =

Firefighting education establishment in Wisconsin, US

Ansul Fire School is a fire school which was founded in 1940 and is located in Marinette, Wisconsin, United States. It trains students with classroom and field instruction, with emphasis on hands-on firefighting. The school has educated thousands of first responders from high-risk / hazard industries such as aviation, mining, oil & gas, chemical, electricity, fire service, and metal processing since 1940.
