= Lincoln Correctional Facility =

Minimum-security state prison for men located in New York, US

Coordinates: 40.7977°N 73.9506°W

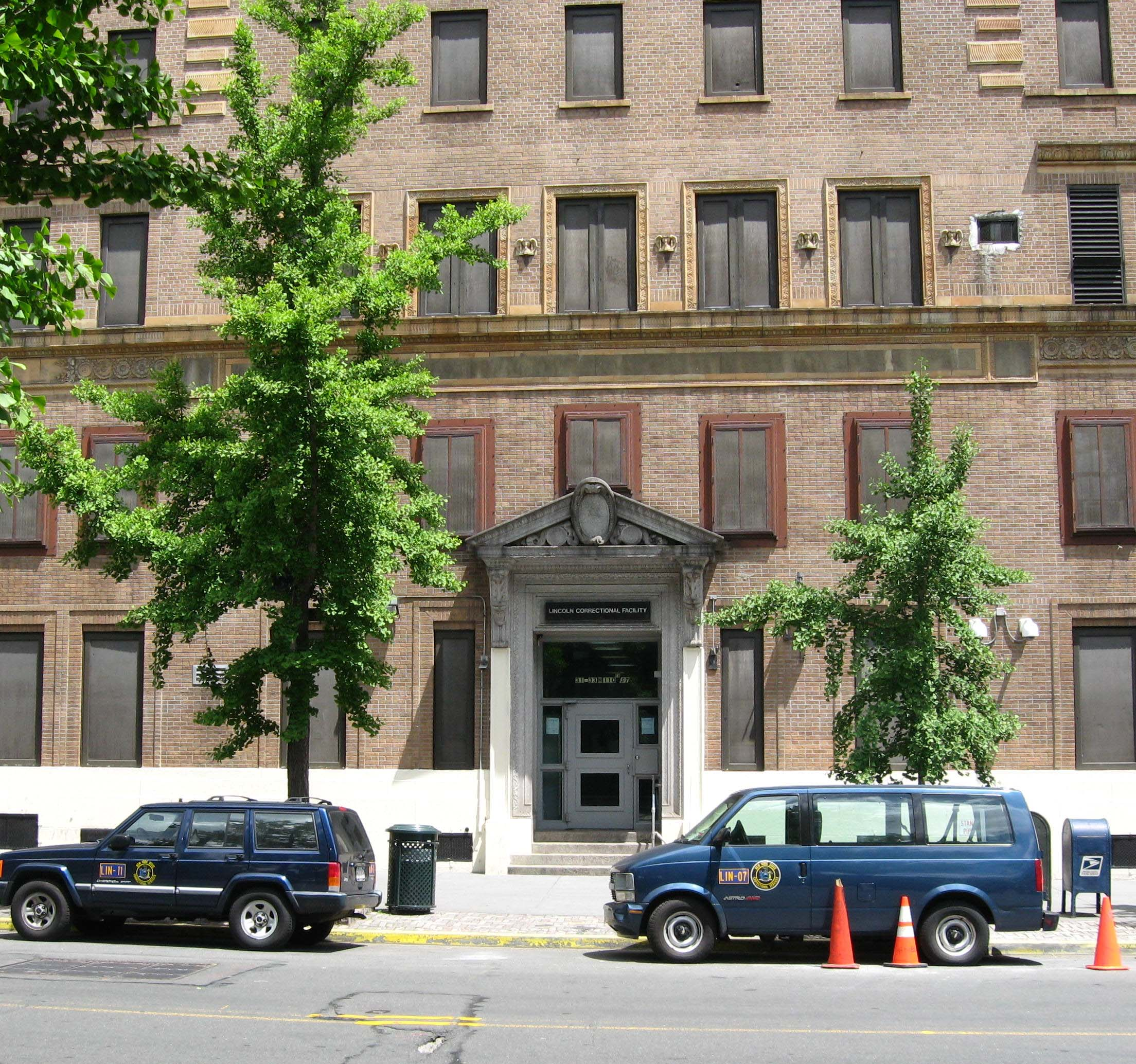
- Interactive map of Lincoln Correctional Facility
- Location: 31-33 West 110th Street Manhattan, NYC
- Status: closed (9/1/2019)
- Security class: minimum (work-release)
- Capacity: 275
- Opened: 1976
- Closed: 2019
- Managed by: New York State Department of Corrections and Community Supervision

Lincoln Correctional Facility was a United States minimum-security men's prison located at 31–33 West 110th Street in Manhattan, New York, facing the north side of Central Park. It was used primarily as a work-release center for drug offenders; however, around 5% of the roughly 275 inmates it housed were white collar criminals, sometimes for work release.

== History ==
Before opening as a prison in 1976, the building was used as a branch of the Young Women's Hebrew Association (YWHA) and for housing recently immigrated Jewish women in need of assistance, beginning in 1914. In 1942 it was sold to the U.S. Army and briefly used as a rest-and-relaxation center for local soldiers during World War II, after which it was occupied by the experimental New Lincoln School, and the Northside Center for Child Development, which conducted research in psychology.

It was announced by Governor Andrew Cuomo on May 17, 2019, that the facility would close on September 1 as part of the 2020 State Budget that was approved on April 1. When it closed, there was speculation that it would be sold and turned into condos, affordable housing, or a women's jail, However it remained vacant until May 29, 2023, when NYC officials said the state would provide the facility as a temporary site to house asylum seekers.
