= List of IBM facilities =

This is a list of facilities used by the International Business Machines Corporation (IBM).

== List ==
- 51 Astor Place
- 330 North Wabash
- 590 Madison Avenue
- 1250 René-Lévesque
- Cambridge Scientific Center
- Tour Eqho
- HITEC City
- Hursley House
- IBM Canada Head Office Building
- IBM Fujisawa
- IBM Hakozaki Facility
- IBM Hursley
- IBM La Gaude
- IBM North Harbour
- IBM railway station
- IBM Israel
- IBM Research
- IBM Research – Australia
- IBM Research – Brazil
- IBM Research – Zurich
- IBM Rochester
- IBM Rome Software Lab
- IBM Somers Office Complex
- IBM Toronto Software Lab
- IBM Toyosu Facility
- IBM Yamato Facility
- IBM Laboratory Vienna
- One Atlantic Center
- Thomas J. Watson Research Center
- UBD IBM Centre
- Spango Valley § IBM
