= Develothon =

Skill development marathon

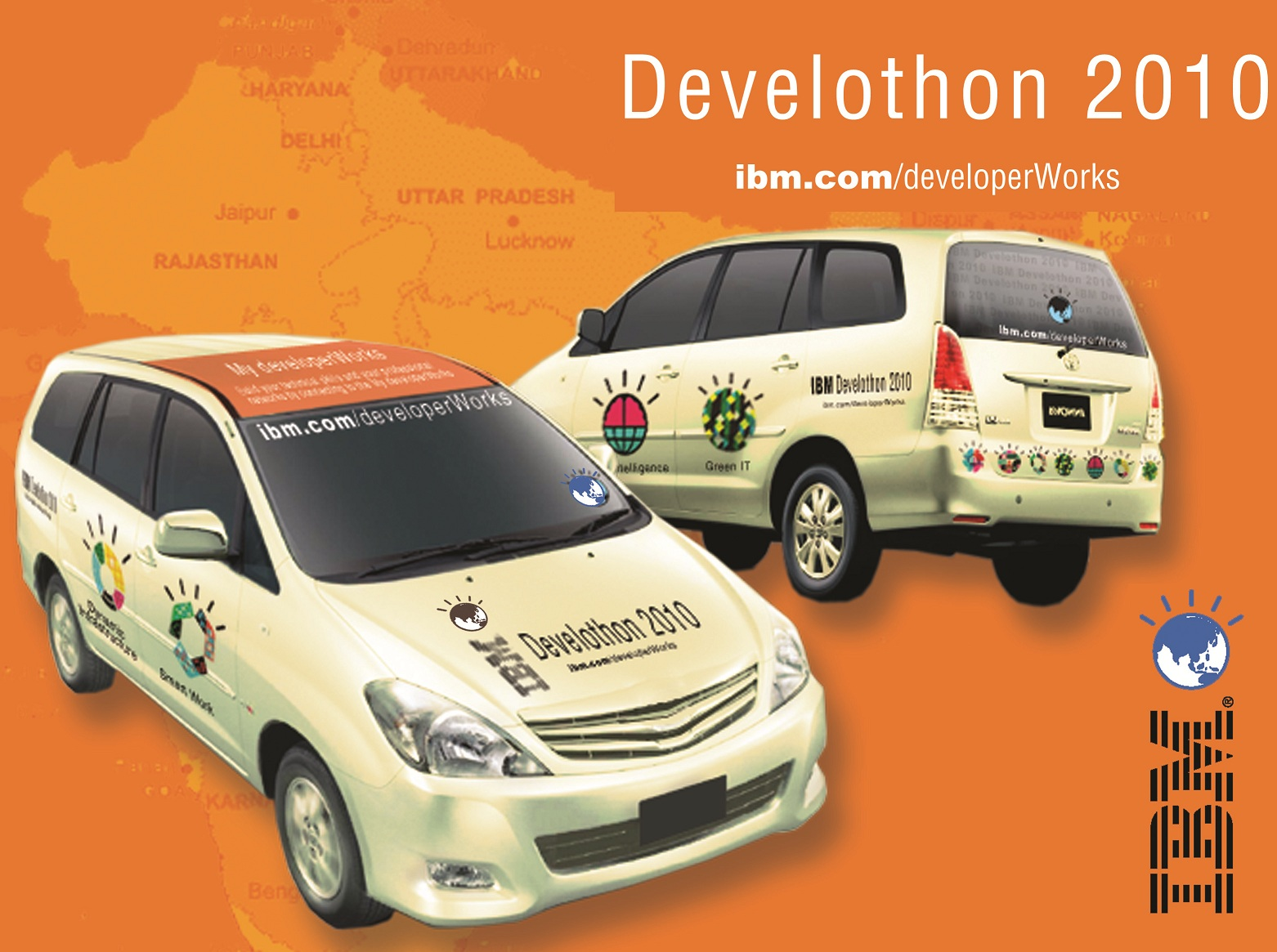
- Genre: Skill Development
- Begins: February - March
- Ends: April
- Frequency: Annual
- Location: India
- Inaugurated: 2010
- Patron: IBM
- Website: Develothon

Develothon is a developer skill marathon aimed at helping the software developer community in India develop skills in newer technology areas. The name Develothon is derived from combining 'developerWorks' and 'Marathon'.

== Concept ==
Develothon 2010 was a pan-India road show integrated with the IBM developerWorks forum and focused on topics covered under the Smarter Planet initiative. The program aimed to bring about active transformational learning through 40 Unconferences in 31 cities along with 40 technical briefings. Seventy five speakers delivered sessions chosen by the audience. In each city, the audience got a chance to vote speakers for the Top Speaker Trophy based on their presentation abstract and session delivery. It was conceived by Himanshu Goyal and his team including Kunal Dureja, Bharti Muthu, Prasanna Kumar, Apra Sahey, Dhirender Nirwani, Sarvanan Sekar, P Dasgupta, Anil Menon, Malathi Srinivasan, Pradeep Nair and many others at IBM.

In metro cities, the technical sessions with flexible agenda covered all of Smarter Planet themes, while in Tier 2 and Tier 3 smaller cities of India, the program offered technical briefing sessions on emerging technology topics such as Cloud Computing and Web 2.0. The sessions also focused on key IBM Software Group technologies such as Rational, Information Management, WebSphere, Lotus and Tivoli in accordance with IBM's Smarter Planet Theme of Dynamic Infrastructure, Smart Work, New Intelligence and Smarter Products based on local geographic needs.

== Limca Book of Records ==
Develothon has been awarded the Limca Book of Records award under Learning for delivering skill marathon covering 40 Live technical briefings in 31 cities. Skill Marathon happens in a relay format with each set of team members passing the baton on to another set of team members during the trip thus ensuring continuity across the complete 40 days of the journey.

== IBM developerWorks ==
developerWorks

Since 1999, IBM developerWorks has been a key destination for IT professionals as a comprehensive source for technical content, trial code, and forums. developerWorks continues to help software professionals stay ahead of the latest trends in open standards, develop new skills, solve problems, and work collaboratively with peers.

In addition to this, developerWorks offers an online community called My developerWorks, which was created to help users build relationships with technical professionals who have similar interests.

The Develothon Program was plugged into developerWorks to enable developers and academia to learn both online and offline. Some of the online learning aids from developerWorks that were available in the Develothon program were product trials, technology eKits, downloadable or cloud based sandboxes, online briefings, free eBooks, training SkillKits, Java Development Kit (JDK) and online workshops.

Over 18,000 IT professionals were skilled in 2009 in India.

== Develothon 2010 Itinerary ==
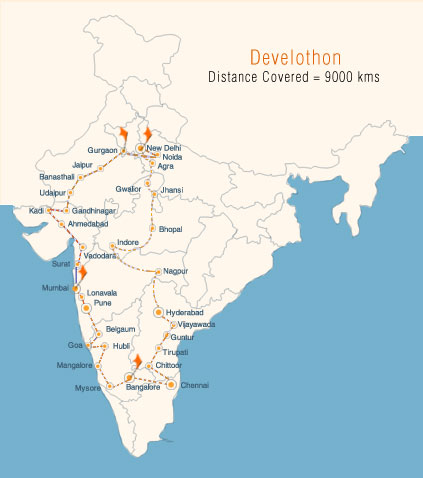
Develothon Itinerary 2010

The program started on 22 March in Mumbai and passed through various Metro, tier II and III cities. After covering a distance of over 4598 kilometers across 12 cities from 11 states and connecting more than 5000 people, Develothon 2010 finally ended its journey back in Mumbai on 30 April.

Date	Venue	City
March 22, 2010	Sahara Star	Mumbai
March 22, 2010	Sinhgad Institute of Technology	Lonavala
March 23, 2010	O Hotel	Pune
March 23, 2010	Vishwakarma Institute of Technology	Pune
March 25, 2010	Gogte Institute of Technology	Belgaum
March 26, 2010	Hotel Fidalgo	Goa
March 27, 2010	BV Bhoomaraddi College of Engg. & Technology	Hubli
March 29, 2010	NMAM Institute of Technology	Mangalore
March 30, 2010	Hotel Royal Orchid	Bangalore
March 30, 2010	MS Ramaiah Institute of Technology	Bangalore
March 31, 2010	National Institute of Engineering	Mysore
April 1, 2010	Dayanand Sagar College of Engineering	Bangalore
April 5, 2010	Le Meridian	Chennai
April 5, 2010	RMK Engineering College	Chennai
April 6, 2010	Sri Venkateswera College	Chitoor
April 6, 2010	Sri Vidyaniketan Engineering College	Tirupati
April 7, 2010	Vignan University	Guntur
April 8, 2010	KL University	Vijayawada
April 9, 2010	Fortune Select Manohar	Hyderabad
April 9, 2010	Padmasri BV Raju Institute of Technology	Hyderabad
April 12, 2010	The Pride Hotel	Nagpur
April 14, 2010	Lemon Tree Hotel	Indore
April 14, 2010	Chameli Devi institute of Technology & Mgmt	Indore
April 15, 2010	Sagar Institute Of Research and Technology	Bhopal
April 16, 2010	Bundelkhand Institute of Engg and Technology	Jhansi
April 16, 2010	Indian Institute of Information Tech. & Mgmt.	Gwalior
April 17, 2010	BMAS Engineering College	Agra
April 19, 2010	ITC Sheraton	Delhi
April 19, 2010	JSS Academy of Technical Education	Noida
April 20, 2010	Fortune Select Global	Gurgaon
April 21, 2010	SKIT	Jaipur
April 22, 2010	KK Royal	Jaipur
April 22, 2010	Banasthali Vidyapith	Banasthali
April 23, 2010	Geetanjali Institute of Technical Studies	Udaipur
April 23, 2010	Pandit Deendayal Petroleum University	Gandhinagar
April 26, 2010	The Grand Bhagwati	Ahmedabad
April 26, 2010	S V Institute of Computer Studies	Kadi
April 26, 2010	The Gateway Hotel	Vadodara
April 27, 2010	Dharamsingh Desai University	Vadodara
April 30, 2010	Sahara Star	Mumbai

== Webathon 2010 ==
Develothon continues its skill journey in a new online avatar called Webathon 2010. Spread across 10 days and delivered over the Internet, Webathon is an e-learning Skill Marathon providing daily virtual briefings on the 10 most vital software and emerging technology tracks. Webathon is on from Oct 19 - Nov 1 2010.

Date	Sessions
19th Oct 2010	Agile Development with Jazz & Rational Team Concert
20th Oct 2010	Business Performance Management using IBM Cognos
21st Oct 2010	Developing Applications in the Cloud using WebSphere Application Server
22nd Oct 2010	Developing next generation Web 2.0 applications in Lotus
25th Oct 2010	Greater confidence and improved business performance with software quality done right
26th Oct 2010	Integrated Service Management
27th Oct 2010	Industry Solutions from IBM
28th Oct 2010	Unleash the Power of Web 2.0 with Websphere Portal
29th Oct 2010	Model Driven Systems Development using Rhapsody
1st Nov 2010	The Power of IBM DB2
