= Kenneth Simonds =

American businessman and philanthropist (1935-2009)

Kenneth Wayne Simonds
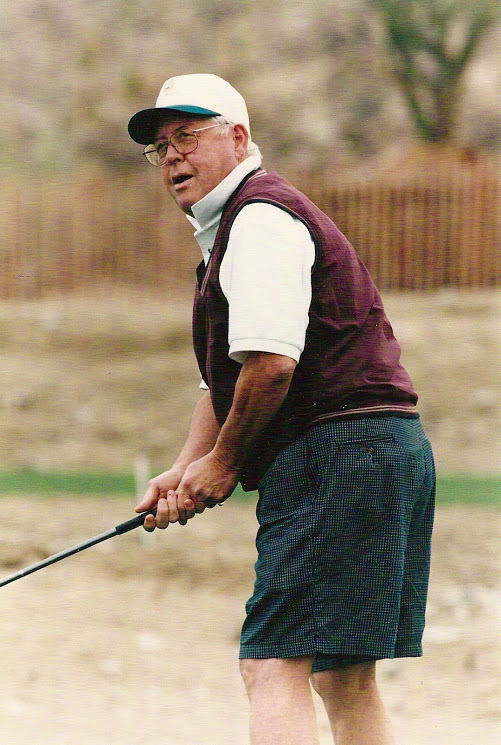
- Born: May 5, 1935; Kingsport, TN
- Died: October 11, 2009 (aged 74); Indian Wells, CA
- Years active: 1958-1993
- Employer(s): IBM, Amdahl, Teradata
- Spouse: Sarah R. Simonds (1935)
- Children: 5

Kenneth Wayne Simonds (May 5, 1935 – October 11, 2009) was an American businessman and philanthropist.

== Life ==
He began his career in 1958 at IBM and was the youngest IBM manager when promoted to Green Bay, Wisconsin. He left IBM in 1975 to become an executive with Amdahl Corporation, starting as vice president of Western operations in 1975. He was promoted in 1976 to Vice President of Product Support and Services and promoted in 1979 to Senior Vice President of U.S. Operations. In 1981, he was promoted to Executive Vice President and Chief Operating Officer where he would stay until briefly going into retirement in 1984. He was a member of the team which had led Amdahl from no revenue in 1975 to $800 million in revenue in 1984. He left retirement a year later, going to work for Teradata in 1985 as chief executive officer. He stayed with Teradata, through its initial public offering in 1987 and sale to NCR Corporation in 1991 for $250 million. He retired shortly after that.

== Personal life ==
=== 1935-1975 ===
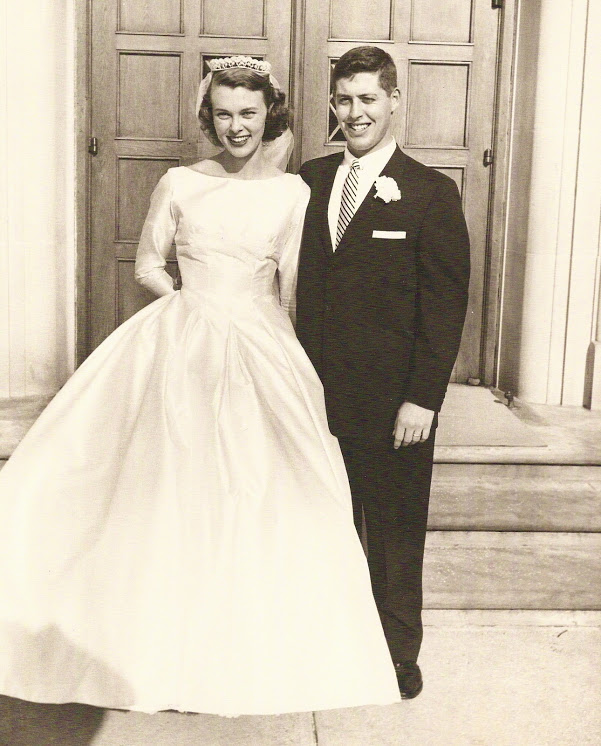
Kenneth and his wife Sarah on their wedding day

Kenneth Wayne Simonds was born to Pauline and Wayne Simonds May 5, 1935. In his earlier childhood, he was in Boy Scouts. As a child he had a pet pig named "Monster." In 1949 he attended Dobyns-Bennett High School in Kingsport, Tennessee where he played many sports including football and track. He graduated high school in 1953. He attended George Washington University for a year on a football scholarship but later transferred to East Tennessee State University. He ran for University Student Body, while there. In 1957 graduated from with a BS in business. Later that year, he would meet his wife Sarah "Sally" Simonds in IBM classes. In 1958 he married Sarah in Columbus, Ohio. In 1959 their first child, Robert "Rob", was born and they went on to have four other children Cindy, David, Joe and Kenneth Jr. In 1975 they moved to Los Altos, California. Kenneth's eldest son, Robert, would also enter into the computer industry, joining Amdahl in 1985.

=== 1980-2009 and beyond ===
In the mid 1980s, the Simonds family moved to Manhattan Beach, California and after retirement from Teradata, they moved to Indian Wells, California in the Coachella Valley 1993. He was an assistant football coach for Palm Desert High School during the 1999-2000 season. He died on October 11, 2009, at his home in Indian Wells. His funeral was held at Southwest Church in Palm Desert. His resting place is Indio, California. In 2015 his wife contributed one million dollars in his name to help fund the building of the football stadium at East Tennessee State University, a goal he had while alive. In the years following his death, Sarah Simonds has made considerable donations to some of Simonds' favorite charities in his honor.

=== Interest in the golf industry ===
In 1988, Simonds founded the Practice Tee Corporation and built three facilities and courses for practice. In 1996, he sold the business to Family Golf Centers, a public company. He opened The Golf Center in Palm Desert in 1995. The Simonds family continued to own and operate the facilities for many years after until the mid-2000s when they sold it to The First Tee, where it continues to operate as a First Tee facility.

== Awards and legacy ==
In 1981 Simonds received the "Spirit of Life" Award from the City of Hope Medical Center as Humanitarian of the Year from the Technology Community. Simonds was a finalist for Entrepreneur of the Year in Southern California in 1989. In 2000 Simonds was named Outstanding Alumnus by East Tenn. State University. Simonds wanted to bring back the ETSU football team and in 2007 was prepared to make a large donation before the plans fell through. In 2008 he and his wife were awarded the Outstanding Community Leader Award by the College of the Desert Alumni Foundation. In 2009, Simonds was posthumously inducted into the Dobyns-Bennett Alumni Association Hall of Fame. In 2011, the Athletic performance center at College of the Desert was opened, named after him. In 2015 Simonds was posthumously awarded the Chancellor's Award for Excellence in Philanthropy by Tennessee Board of Regents member Parker Smith as well as his wife for their donations given to ETSU. In 2015 Simonds' wife Sarah and their children Ken Jr., David and Joseph were presented with a football signed by current ETSU football players at halftime of a game. Kenneth and his family are honored outside of the new ETSU stadium with plaques along with the other donors.

== See also ==
- The Legend of Amdahl by Jeffrey L. Rodengen (ISBN 9780945903192.)
