= IBM Toronto Software Lab =

Software development lab in Toronto, Canada

Coordinates: 43.849013°N 79.338399°W

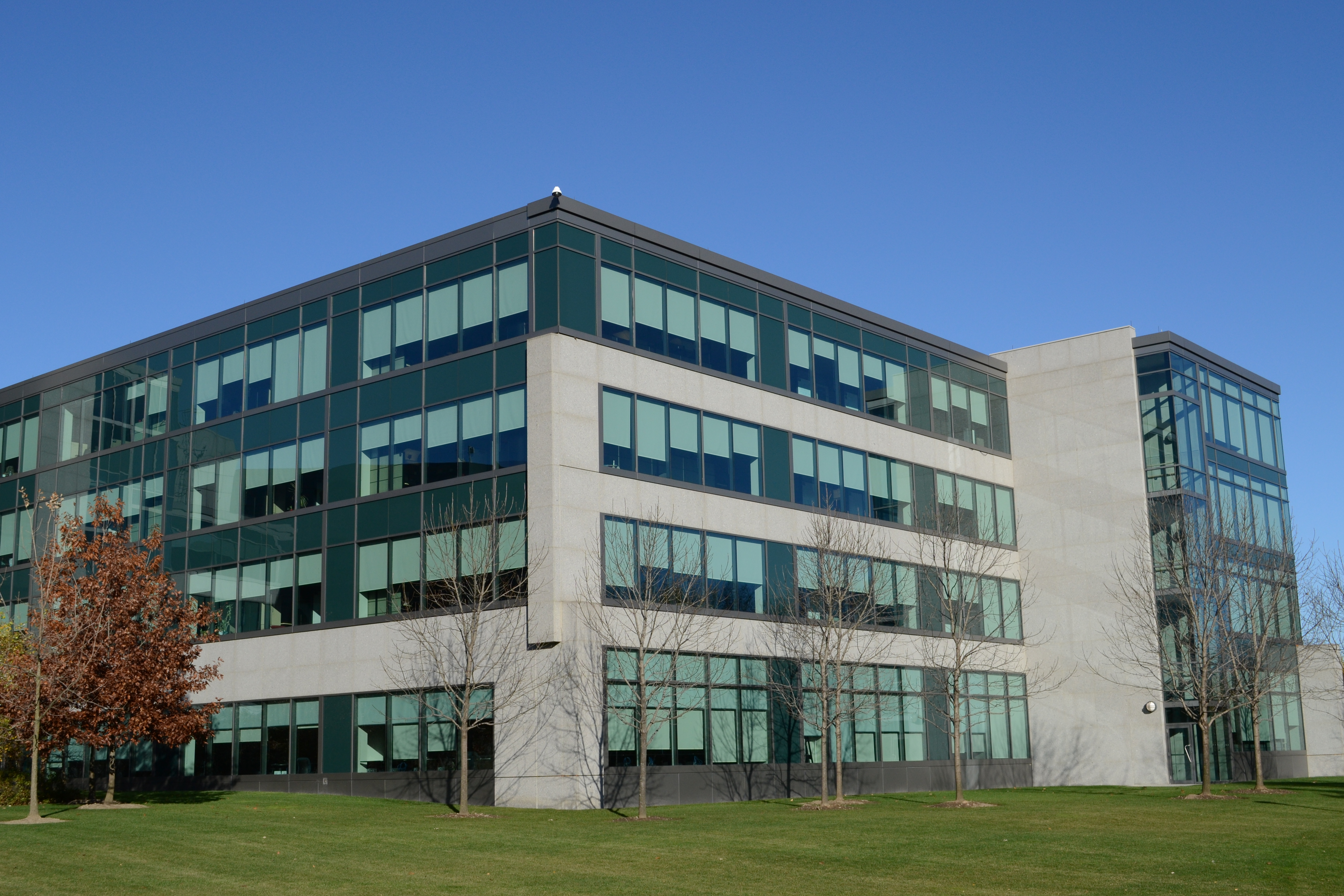
- IBM Toronto Software Lab, seen in 2010
- Founded: 1967
- Headquarters: 8200 Warden Avenue, Markham, Ontario, Canada
- Brands: IBM
- Website: IBM Canada Software Lab

The IBM Toronto Software Lab is the largest software development laboratory in Canada and IBM's third largest software lab. Established in 1967 with 55 employees, the Toronto Lab, now located in Markham has grown to employ 2,500 people. These employees develop some of IBM's middleware. Some of these include Db2, WebSphere Commerce, WebSphere Customer Center, Tivoli Provisioning Manager, IBM i compilers, and Rational Application Developer.

Originally located in a building at 1150 Eglinton Avenue East in Toronto, the software lab was relocated to Markham on September 11, 2001. The former building was subsequently used by Celestica.

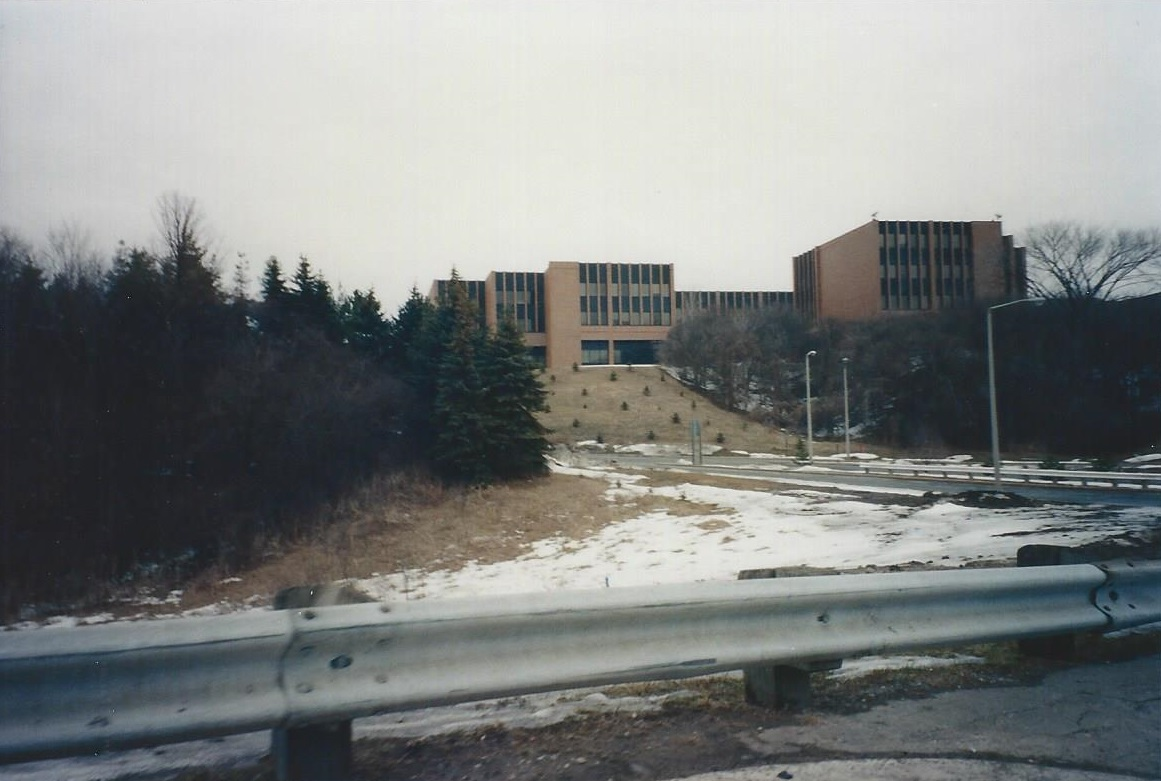

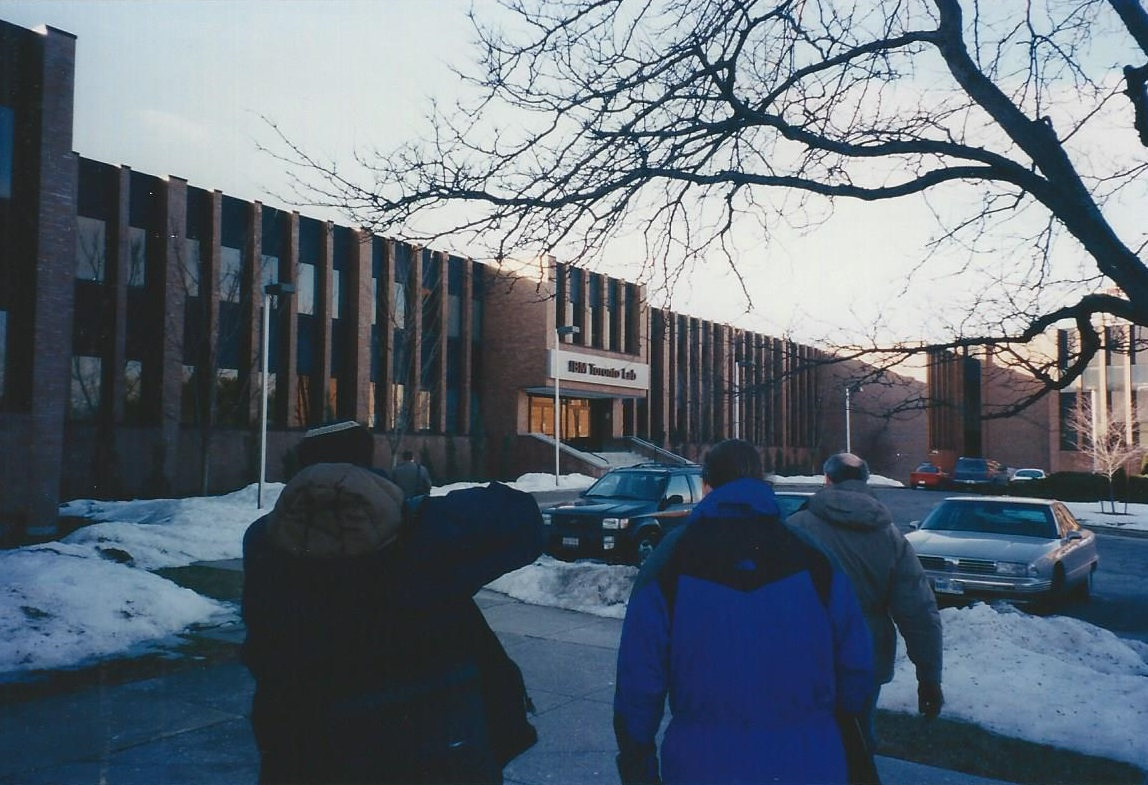
Previous IBM Toronto Lab location on Eglinton Avenue East, as seen in 1999

== See also ==
- IBM Canada Head Office Building
- IBM Centers for Advanced Studies
- IBM CASCON
- IBM Rome Software Lab
