= Steve Ward (businessman) =

Stephen M. Ward, Jr. (born 1955) is an American businessman who previously served as the chief executive officer of Lenovo. For 26 years Ward managed a number of key products and divisions before being appointed chief information officer of IBM. Ward's credentials include being an assistant to IBM Chairman at the firm's headquarter's in Armonk, New York. His formal education includes a Bachelor of Science degree in mechanical engineering from California Polytechnic State University, San Luis Obispo, California.

In early September 2005, Ward authorized the donation of 1,500 Lenovo Notebook Computers to aid victims of Hurricane Katrina, so that displaced people could communicate their status with family members and friends.

Ward was succeeded as Lenovo's CEO on December 20, 2005, by William Amelio. Ward currently serves or previously served on the board of directors of lenovo, C3.ai, E Ink, KLX Energy Services, E2open, and Carpenter Technology.
