= IBM Toyosu Facility =

Coordinates: 35.6506°N 139.7993°E

IBM Toyosu Facility, located in Toyosu, Kōtō-ku, Tokyo, Japan, is one of the two largest facilities occupied by IBM in Tokyo, the other being IBM Hakozaki Facility. It mainly houses IBM's research and development, and delivery functions. The building is owned by Nippon Building Fund, affiliated to Mitsui Bank, and was built in 2004.

== General description ==
IBM Toyosu Facility is located at 6-52, Toyosu 5-chōme, Kōtō-ku, Tokyo. The 11-story building is owned by Nippon Building Fund, affiliated to Mitsui Bank, as "NBF Canal Front", at a location facing the canals in the reclaimed land of Tokyo Bay. It was designed and built by Shimizu Corporation as "IST Building" in September 2004, for IST Development.

IBM Toyosu mainly houses IBM's delivery functions and, since July 2012, research and development functions.

- IBM Japan Services (delivery)
- IBM Research - Tokyo
- IBM Tokyo Laboratory

== Access ==
- Toyosu Station (6a Exit) on Tokyo Metro Yūrakuchō Line
- Fukagawa Gochū-mae Stop by Tokyo Metropolitan Bus

== See also ==
- IBM
- IBM Japan, Ltd. (in Japanese)
- IBM Yamato Facility (R&D formerly)
