= Mark N. Greene =

Mark N. Greene was CEO of OpenLink Financial LLC from September 2012 through September 2015. Previously, he was CEO of Fair Isaac Corporation. Before that, he spent 12 years working at IBM. Before IBM, Greene worked at Technology Solutions Company, New York City, Berkeley Investment Technologies, and Citicorp, among others. He began his career in 1982 as an economist with the Federal Reserve Board.

Greene received his bachelor's degree in Economics at Amherst College, and holds master’s and doctorate degrees in Economics from the University of Michigan.
