= Indian Wells, California =

Indian Wells Kávinish (Cahuilla)
- City
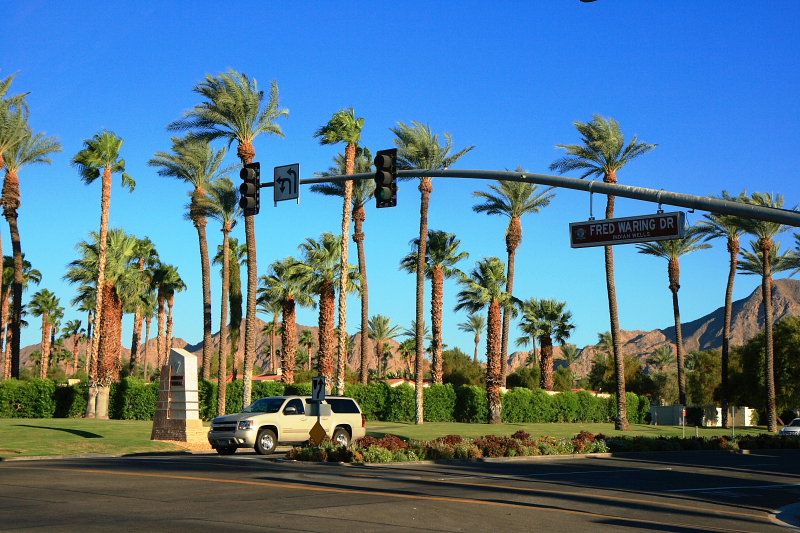
- City limit as seen from Palm Desert, California
- Nickname: I.W.
- Interactive map of Indian Wells
- Location in the United States
- Coordinates: 33°43′07″N 116°18′30″W
- Country: United States
- State: California
- County: Riverside
- Incorporated: July 14, 1967

Government
  - Type: Council–manager
  - Mayor: Toper Taylor
  - Mayor Pro Tem: Brian Penna
  - City Council: Greg Sanders; Dana Reed; Bruce Whitman

Area
  - Total: 14.58 sq mi (37.77 km^{2})
  - Land: 14.32 sq mi (37.09 km^{2})
  - Water: 0.26 sq mi (0.68 km^{2}) 1.80%
- Elevation: 89 ft (27 m)

Population (2020)
  - Total: 4,757
  - Density: 332.2/sq mi (128.25/km^{2})
- Time zone: UTC−8 (Pacific)
  - Summer (DST): UTC−7 (PDT)
- ZIP Code: 92210
- Area codes: 442/760
- FIPS code: 06-36434
- GNIS feature IDs: 1660797, 2410100
- Website: www.indianwellsca.gov

Indian Wells is a city in Riverside County, California, United States, in the Coachella Valley. Incorporated in 1967, it lies in between the cities of Palm Desert and La Quinta. As of the 2020 census, the city population was 4,757.

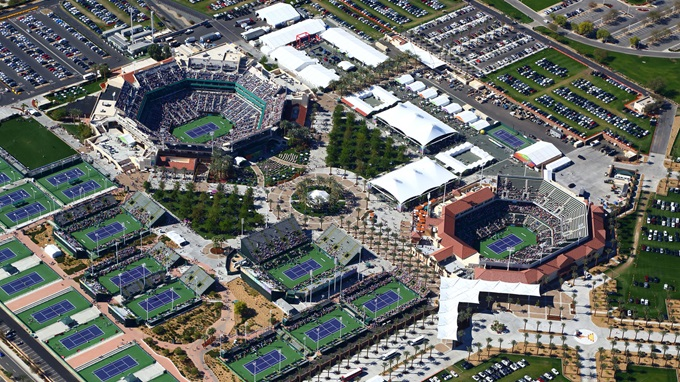
Indian Wells Tennis Garden in 2014

The city hosts the sixth-largest tennis tournament in the world, the Indian Wells Masters tennis tournament, presently known as the BNP Paribas Open. The Indian Wells Masters is one of nine ATP Masters 1000 tournaments operated by the Association of Tennis Professionals, and one of the four mandatory WTA 1000 tournaments of the Women's Tennis Association. It is held at the Indian Wells Tennis Garden, which contains the second-largest tennis-specific stadium in the world.

== History ==
The city derived its name from a historic Cahuilla Native American water reservoir, which served as a crucial water supply for nearby tribes.

As early as 1820, the area now known as Indian Wells was the site of a thriving Indian village, as reported by W.P. Blade, a Smithsonian Institution geologist. A decade later, when gold was discovered on the Colorado River, William D. Bradshaw built a trail from Los Angeles through the desert to the gold mines. The Alexander and Company Stage Line used the trail to transport prospectors and Indian Wells became an important stop along the trail. Competition from the Southern Pacific Railroad caused the route to be abandoned briefly in 1875 before being reactivated by the Wells Fargo company the following year.

Over the next decades, settlers gradually arrived in the area and date palm ranches became profitable. The area's first golf courses were opened in the 1950s at the Eldorado Country Club and the Indian Wells Country Club. In 1957, Desi Arnaz opened his Indian Wells Hotel (forerunner to the Indian Wells Resort Hotel). In 1960, Arnold Palmer won the first Bob Hope Desert Classic golf tournament. President Dwight D. Eisenhower was a regular Indian Wells visitor and later an Eldorado homeowner.

In an election held on June 27, 1967, to avoid being annexed by neighboring cities such as Palm Desert, the inhabitants of Indian Wells voted to incorporate as a city. On July 14, 1967, Indian Wells became California's 400th city and the 16th in Riverside County. Since then, Indian Wells has continued to grow, with the development of resort hotels, golf courses and luxury residential areas.

== Demographics ==
Historical population
Census	Pop.	Note	%±
1970	760		—
1980	1,394		83.4%
1990	2,647		89.9%
2000	3,816		44.2%
2010	4,958		29.9%
2020	4,757		−4.1%
U.S. Decennial Census

=== Racial and ethnic composition ===
Indian Wells city, California – Racial and ethnic composition Note: the US Census treats Hispanic/Latino as an ethnic category. This table excludes Latinos from the racial categories and assigns them to a separate category. Hispanics/Latinos may be of any race.
Race / Ethnicity (NH = Non-Hispanic)	Pop 1990	Pop 2000	Pop 2010	Pop 2020	% 1990	% 2000	% 2010	% 2020
White alone (NH)	2,548	3,669	4,574	4,135	96.26%	96.15%	92.25%	86.92%
Black or African American alone (NH)	9	14	28	37	0.34%	0.37%	0.56%	0.78%
Native American or Alaska Native alone (NH)	0	8	20	10	-	0.21%	0.40%	0.21%
Asian alone (NH)	36	57	78	128	1.36%	1.49%	1.57%	2.69%
Native Hawaiian or Pacific Islander alone (NH)	36	3	2	4	1.36%	0.08%	0.04%	0.08%
Other race alone (NH)	0	4	7	22	-	0.10%	0.14%	0.46%
Mixed race or Multiracial (NH)	x	34	40	111	x	0.89%	0.81%	2.33%
Hispanic or Latino (any race)	54	113	209	310	2.04%	2.96%	4.22%	6.52%
Total	2,647	3,816	4,958	4,757	100.00%	100.00%	100.00%	100.00%

=== 2020 census ===
As of the 2020 census, Indian Wells had a population of 4,757. The population density was 332.2 inhabitants per square mile (128.3/km^{2}). 88.0% of residents lived in urban areas, while 12.0% lived in rural areas.

The whole population lived in households. There were 2,634 households, of which 7.7% had children under the age of 18 living in them. Of all households, 51.8% were married-couple households, 4.6% were cohabiting couple households, 29.0% had a female householder with no spouse or partner present, and 14.6% had a male householder with no spouse or partner present. About 35.6% of all households were made up of individuals, and 28.2% had someone living alone who was 65 years of age or older. The average household size was 1.81. There were 1,544 families (58.6% of all households).

The age distribution was 6.6% under the age of 18, 2.2% aged 18 to 24, 6.5% aged 25 to 44, 23.5% aged 45 to 64, and 61.3% who were 65 years of age or older. The median age was 69.2 years. For every 100 females, there were 86.3 males, and for every 100 females age 18 and over there were 84.5 males age 18 and over.

There were 5,140 housing units at an average density of 359.0 units per square mile (138.6 units/km^{2}), of which 2,634 (51.2%) were occupied. Of these, 82.4% were owner-occupied, and 17.6% were occupied by renters. 48.8% of housing units were vacant. The homeowner vacancy rate was 3.6% and the rental vacancy rate was 13.4%.

=== 2010 census ===
The 2010 United States census reported that Indian Wells had a population of 4,958. The population density was 339.8 inhabitants per square mile (131.2/km^{2}). The racial makeup of Indian Wells was 4,721 (95.2%) White (92.3% Non-Hispanic White), 29 (0.6%) African American, 20 (0.4%) Native American, 83 (1.7%) Asian, 2 (0.0%) Pacific Islander, 52 (1.0%) from other races, and 51 (1.0%) from two or more races. Hispanic or Latino of any race were 209 persons (4.2%).

The Census reported that 4,952 people (99.9% of the population) lived in households, 6 (0.1%) lived in non-institutionalized group quarters, and 0 (0%) were institutionalized.

There were 2,745 households, out of which 193 (7.0%) had children under the age of 18 living in them, 1,519 (55.3%) were opposite-sex married couples living together, 85 (3.1%) had a female householder with no husband present, 46 (1.7%) had a male householder with no wife present. There were 85 (3.1%) unmarried opposite-sex partnerships, and 36 (1.3%) same-sex married couples or partnerships. 944 households (34.4%) were made up of individuals, and 690 (25.1%) had someone living alone who was 65 years of age or older. The average household size was 1.80. There were 1,650 families (60.1% of all households); the average family size was 2.22.

The age distribution was: 310 people (6.3%) under the age of 18, 76 people (1.5%) aged 18 to 24, 283 people (5.7%) aged 25 to 44, 1,558 people (31.4%) aged 45 to 64, and 2,731 people (55.1%) who were 65 years of age or older. The median age was 66.7 years. For every 100 females, there were 84.6 males. For every 100 females age 18 and over, there were 84.2 males.

There were 5,137 housing units at an average density of 352.1 per square mile (135.9/km^{2}), of which 2,285 (83.2%) were owner-occupied, and 460 (16.8%) were occupied by renters. The homeowner vacancy rate was 5.1%; the rental vacancy rate was 15.4%. 4,251 people (85.7% of the population) lived in owner-occupied housing units and 701 people (14.1%) lived in rental housing units.

=== Income and poverty ===
During 2009–2013, Indian Wells had a median household income of $83,884, with 5.2% of the population living below the federal poverty line.

In 2023, the US Census Bureau estimated that the median household income was $145,313, and the per capita income was $142,360. About 1.4% of families and 3.9% of the population were below the poverty line.

== Geography ==
Indian Wells is located at 33°42′57″N 116°20′28″W (33.715755, −116.341109).

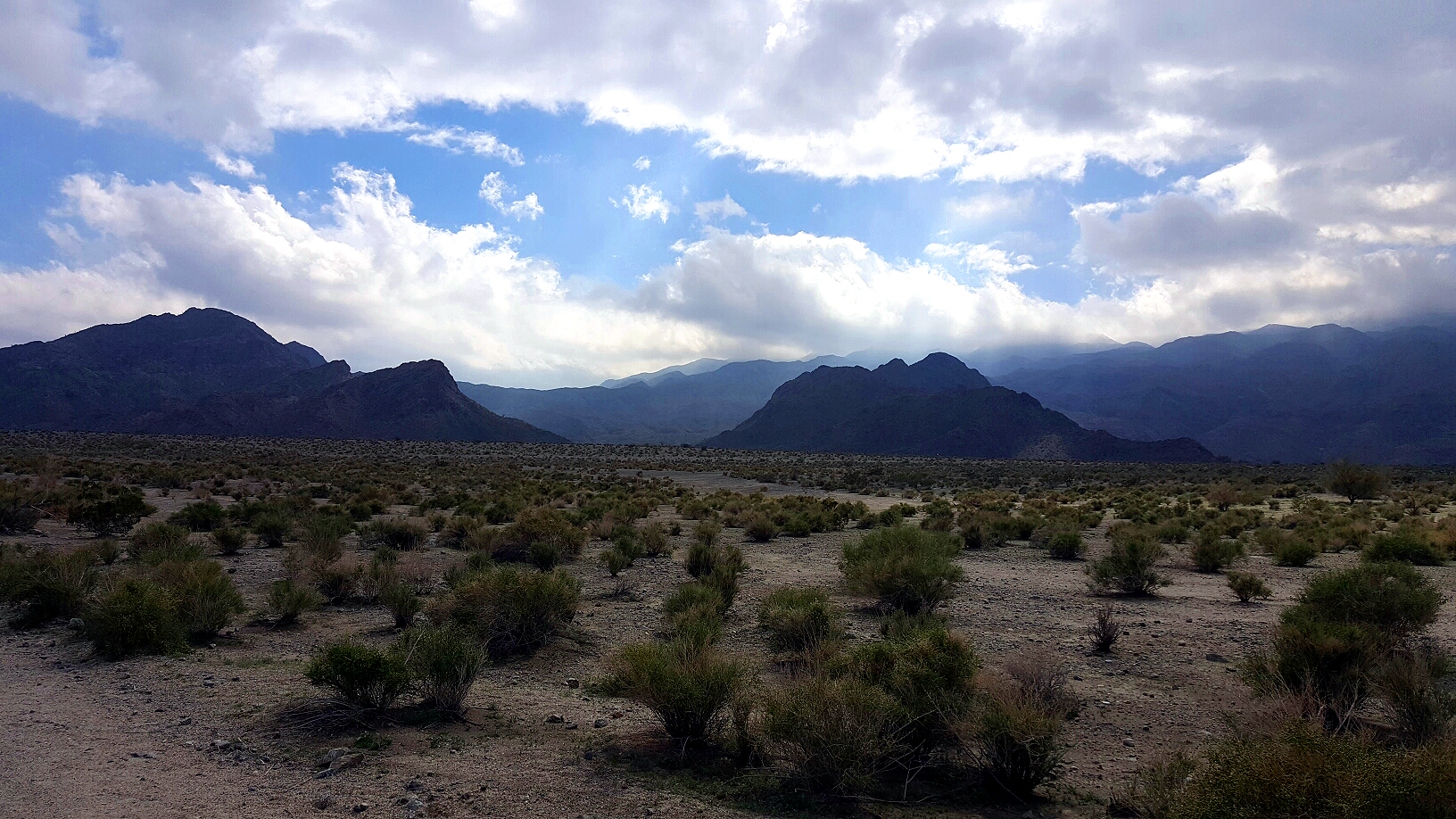
Hiking trails in the undeveloped area of Indian Wells

According to the United States Census Bureau, the city has a total area of 14.6 square miles (37.8 km^{2}), of which 14.3 square miles (37.1 km^{2}) is land and 0.27 square miles (0.7 km^{2}), comprising 1.80%, is water.

=== Climate ===
This climate is dominated in all months by the subtropical anticyclone, or subtropical high, with its descending air, elevated inversions, and clear skies. Such an atmospheric environment inhibits precipitation.

Climate data for Palm Springs Regional Airport (1991–2020 normals)
Month	Jan	Feb	Mar	Apr	May	Jun	Jul	Aug	Sep	Oct	Nov	Dec	Year
Record high °F (°C)	95 (35)	99 (37)	104 (40)	112 (44)	116 (47)	121 (49)	123 (51)	123 (51)	121 (49)	116 (47)	102 (39)	93 (34)	123 (51)
Mean daily maximum °F (°C)	70.5 (21.4)	73.7 (23.2)	80.6 (27.0)	86.7 (30.4)	94.7 (34.8)	103.6 (39.8)	108.6 (42.6)	108.1 (42.3)	101.8 (38.8)	91.1 (32.8)	78.7 (25.9)	69.2 (20.7)	88.9 (31.6)
Daily mean °F (°C)	59.0 (15.0)	61.7 (16.5)	67.5 (19.7)	72.9 (22.7)	80.3 (26.8)	88.2 (31.2)	94.0 (34.4)	94.0 (34.4)	88.1 (31.2)	77.8 (25.4)	66.0 (18.9)	57.7 (14.3)	75.6 (24.2)
Mean daily minimum °F (°C)	47.6 (8.7)	49.7 (9.8)	54.4 (12.4)	59.1 (15.1)	65.9 (18.8)	72.7 (22.6)	79.4 (26.3)	79.8 (26.6)	74.4 (23.6)	64.5 (18.1)	53.4 (11.9)	46.2 (7.9)	62.3 (16.8)
Record low °F (°C)	19 (−7)	24 (−4)	29 (−2)	34 (1)	36 (2)	44 (7)	54 (12)	52 (11)	46 (8)	30 (−1)	23 (−5)	23 (−5)	19 (−7)
Average precipitation inches (mm)	1.16 (29)	1.16 (29)	0.49 (12)	0.05 (1.3)	0.02 (0.51)	0.02 (0.51)	0.14 (3.6)	0.29 (7.4)	0.22 (5.6)	0.20 (5.1)	0.38 (9.7)	0.70 (18)	4.83 (123)
Average precipitation days	3.8	3.5	2.4	0.7	0.4	0.2	0.7	1.1	1.0	0.8	1.0	2.6	18.2
Source: NOAA

== Politics ==
Indian Wells is a largely Republican city. Since its incorporation in 1967, all Republican candidates for president and governor have carried Indian Wells, with the six Republican presidential candidates from 1968 to 1988, and the seven Republican gubernatorial candidates from 1970 to 1994 each carrying the city by a margin of at least 53 points.

Even as both the state of California and Riverside County trended more Democratic from the 1990s onward, the Republican presidential and gubernatorial candidates have continued to carry Indian Wells by large, albeit smaller margins.

The GOP also retains a very strong voter registration advantage in the city. As of August 30, 2021, there are 3,343 registered voters in the city of Indian Wells. Of these voters, 1,720 (51.45%) are registered Republicans, 868 (25.96%) are registered Democrats, and 557 (16.66%) are not registered with a political party. Indian Wells is one of three incorporated cities in Riverside County where the Republican party retains an outright majority of registered voters as of August 30, 2021, the other two being Canyon Lake and Norco.

Indian Wells city vote by party in presidential elections
Year	Democratic	Republican	Third Parties
2024	43.13% 1,240	55.79% 1,604	1.08% 31
2020	38.96% 1,150	59.65% 1,761	1.39% 41
2016	31.22% 773	65.59% 1,624	3.19% 79
2012	25.80% 674	73.24% 1,913	0.96% 25
2008	31.65% 851	67.09% 1,804	1.26% 34
2004	26.27% 686	73.11% 1,909	0.61% 16
2000	23.61% 547	74.97% 1,737	1.42% 33
1996	20.91% 403	73.22% 1,411	5.86% 113
1992	16.56% 299	60.63% 1,095	22.81% 412
1988	15.64% 239	83.51% 1,276	0.85% 13
1984	11.28% 137	88.23% 1,072	0.49% 6
1980	15.32% 138	78.47% 707	6.22% 56
1976	14.11% 81	85.54% 491	0.35% 2
1972	11.26% 42	87.67% 327	1.07% 4
1968	14.38% 42	81.16% 237	4.45% 13

Indian Wells city vote by party in gubernatorial elections
Year	Democratic	Republican	Third Parties
2022	37.42% 912	62.58% 1,589
2018	32.02% 763	67.98% 1,620
2014	33.88% 661	66.12% 1,290
2010	23.89% 567	74.34% 1,764	1.77% 42
2006	13.31% 293	85.69% 1,886	1.00% 22
2002	20.86% 387	76.66% 1,422	2.48% 46
1998	28.50% 509	70.60% 1,261	0.90% 16
1994	14.69% 268	84.48% 1,541	0.82% 15
1990	19.53% 284	79.30% 1,153	1.17% 17
1986	11.91% 137	87.22% 1,003	0.87% 10
1982	20.41% 179	79.13% 694	0.46% 4
1978	21.14% 119	74.96% 422	3.91% 22
1974	15.80% 70	83.52% 370	0.68% 3
1970	12.80% 37	86.16% 249	1.04% 3

=== Representation ===
In the California State Legislature, Indian Wells is in the 19th senatorial district, represented by Republican Rosilicie Ochoa Bogh, and in the 47th Assembly district, represented by Republican Greg Wallis.

In the United States House of Representatives, Indian Wells is in California's 41st congressional district, represented by Republican Ken Calvert.

== Notable residents ==
- Desi Arnaz† – singer, actor and developer
- James G. Boswell II† – former CEO of the J.G Boswell cotton company
- Robert "Bob" Cummings† – actor
- Tony Curtis† – actor
- Ernest E. Debs† – Los Angeles City Council member and Los Angeles County supervisor
- Bob Einstein† – actor, comedy writer and producer
- Dwight D. Eisenhower† – former U.S. president and avid golfer
- Don Fairfield – golfer
- Howard Haugerud† – military pilot, diplomat, businessman and educator
- Skip Homeier† – actor
- Colleen Kay Hutchins† – former Miss America
- Jack Jones† – singer
- Robert Kardashian† – lawyer
- Charles Koch – businessman
- Arthur Lake† – actor
- W. Howard Lester† – businessman
- Cargill MacMillan Jr.† – businessman†
- Curt Massey† – musician
- Joanna Moore† - actress
- Charles Peebler† – advertising executive
- Roger Perry† – actor
- Robert Prescott† – founder of the Flying Tiger Line
- Charles H. Price II† – businessman and former ambassador
- Gena Rowlands† – actress
- Tommy Shepard† – trombonist and orchestra leader
- Kenneth Simonds† – businessman
- Ernie Vandeweghe† – physician, U.S. Air Force veteran and basketball player; husband of Colleen Kay Hutchins
- Sam B. Williams† – inventor and businessman
- John Wilson – golfer

† Deceased
