= IBM Canada Head Office Building =

Head office of IBM Canada

Coordinates: 43°49′05″N 79°20′06″W

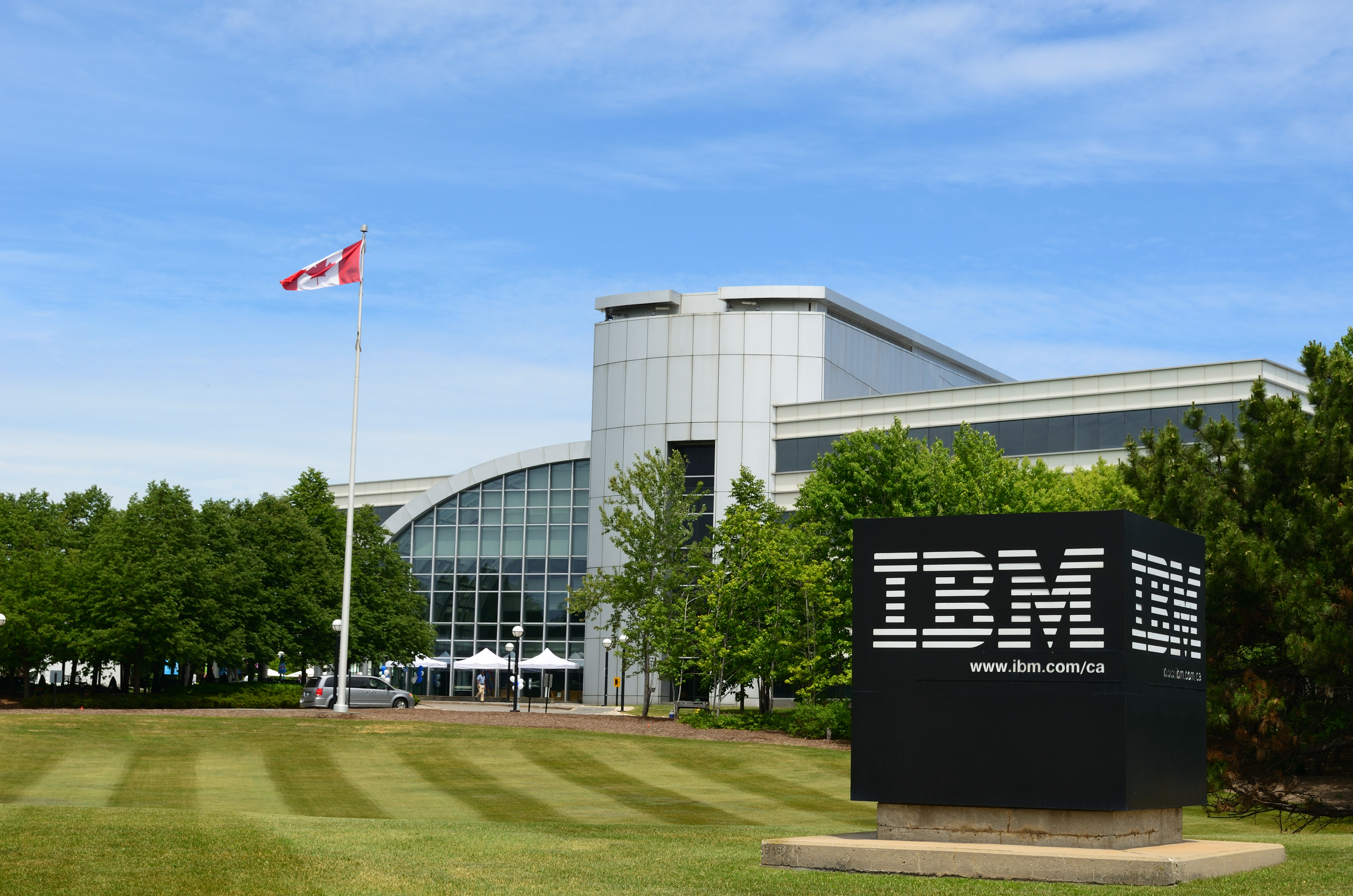
Former IBM Canada Head Office Building at 3600 Steeles East

IBM Canada's head offices are currently located in Markham, Ontario and have been there since the early 1980s. The current building IBM occupies is located at 8200 Warden Avenue and shared with existing tenant IBM Toronto Software Lab in 2001. Head office is being moved from 3600 Steeles Avenue East, which was sold in August 2024 and was completed in 1995. IBM Canada's previous head office was located across the street at 3500 Steeles Avenue East (now Liberty Centre, Markham).

The building rises from four floors on the west to seven floors at the east side. There is an underground ramp that is accessible from the left-most lane on east-bound Steeles Avenue that provides access to the building's parking area at the rear.

== Former head offices 1920-1980s ==
Prior to the 1980s, IBM Canada was located in a sprawling complex at Don Mills Road and Eglinton Avenue East. There are two main buildings at this site. The building located at 844 Don Mills Road was IBM's Canada manufacturing plant and head office and opened in 1951. After many additions to this building a second building on this site opened in 1967 (1150 Eglinton Avenue East) which became the head office and software research lab. When IBM Canada's head offices relocated to Markham, Ontario from Don Mills, their old site continued to operate as a manufacturing and research facility. Both facilities are now owned and operated by Celestica, an electronics manufacturing service provider and former IBM subsidiary, as its global corporate headquarters. The Don Mills building was demolished in 2020 to pave way for major redevelopment near the Don Valley transit station.

Prior to 1951, IBM Canada offices were located on 300 Campbell Avenue and Dupont Street in the city of Toronto's west end. The plant is now home to Wayspa's Canadian operations (as 298 Campbell Avenue). During this period, and well into the 1950s, the company also maintained a downtown office suite located on King Street East immediately opposite the entrance to the famous "King Eddie" Hotel.

Year	Address	Architect	Notes
1917	300 Campbell Avenue		Still used by multiple tenants.
1951	844 Don Mills Road	Clare MacLean	Addition to south side in 1954, demolished in 2020.
1962	36 King Street East	Clare MacLean	office tower still present.
1966	1150 Eglinton Avenue East	John B. Parkin Associates	reused as podium for condo project.
