= IBM Software Group =

Former division of IBM

IBM Software Group (SWG) was one of the major divisions of IBM. Since 2010, it was sub-divided into two groups: Middleware and Solutions

See List of IBM products#Computer software for a list of actual IBM software products.

== Middleware Group ==
- Information Management Software — database servers and tools, text analytics, and content management.
- Rational Software — Software development and application lifecycle management. Acquired in 2002.
- Tivoli Software — Systems management. Acquired in 1995. Re-branded as 'Cloud & Smarter Infrastructure' (C&SI) in 2013.
- WebSphere - An EJB development environment, container, and a series of pre-packaged applications, primarily for management interfaces and web commerce.

== Solutions Group ==
- Lotus Software — Groupware, collaboration and business software. Acquired in 1995.
- Business Analytics — Cognos and SPSS
- Industry Solutions — Enterprise Content Management, Enterprise Marketing Management and B2B&Commerce
