= IBM Hakozaki Facility =

Building in Tokyo, Japan

- ＩＢＭ箱崎ビル（三井倉庫箱崎ビル）
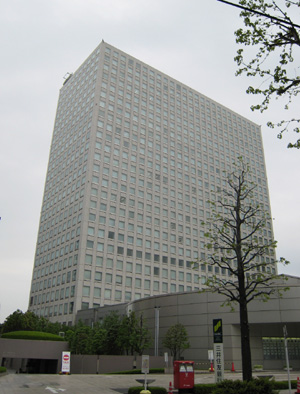
- IBM Hakozaki Facility

- Location within Special wards of Tokyo

General information
- Location: Tokyo, Japan, Japan
- Coordinates: 35.6786°N 139.7872°E
- Completed: 1989
- Client: IBM
- Owner: Mitsui-Soko

Height
- Height: 108.32 m (355.4 ft)

Technical details
- Floor count: 25
- Floor area: 135,601 m^{2} (1,459,600 sq ft)

Design and construction
- Architect: Takenaka Corporation

IBM Hakozaki Facility (ＩＢＭ箱崎ビル or 三井倉庫箱崎ビル) is IBM's largest building in Japan, in terms of the number of people working there. Located in Nihonbashi-Hakozaki-cho, Chuo-ku, Tokyo, it mainly houses IBM's marketing and market support departments, and – since October 2009 – headquarters, which moved from Roppongi, Tokyo. It was built for IBM in 1989.

== General description ==
IBM Hakozaki Facility is located at 19-21 Nihonbashi-Hakozaki-cho, Chuo-ku, Tokyo, on the right bank of the Sumida River. It houses mainly IBM's marketing and systems engineering departments, and is IBM's largest facility in Japan, in terms of the number of people working there. Because of the seminars and demonstrations of the latest products and services frequently held there, it is also familiar to many users and potential users of IBM.

Its main building was completed in 1989, designed by Takenaka Corporation, and is owned and leased by Mitsui-Soko, Mitsui Group's warehousing & distribution company. The building complex also houses cafeterias, restaurants, a post office, a bookstore, a gym and a tea ceremony house.

== Access ==
The facility can be accessed from Suitengūmae Station on the Tokyo Metro Hanzomon Line, Ningyōchō Station on the Toei Asakusa Line, Tokyo City Air Terminal, and from the Toei Bus bus stop.

== See also ==
- IBM Yamato Facility (R&D formerly)
- IBM Toyosu Facility (R&D)
