= IBM Yamato Facility =

Coordinates: 35°30′19.8″N 139°27′7.8″E

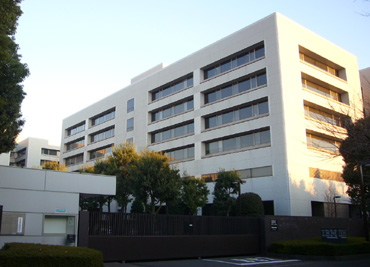
- IBM Yamato Facility - R&D Buildings

General information
- Type: Office
- Location: Yamato, Kanagawa Prefecture, Japan
- Opened: 1985
- Closed: September 2012
- Owner: IBM

IBM Yamato Facility is located in the city of Yamato, Kanagawa Prefecture, Japan, is where IBM's research and development activities were done for IBM's worldwide and Asia-Pacific region market. Its buildings were designed by the architecture firm of Nikken Sekkei Ltd. and completed in 1985. In July 2012, all IBM research and development functions completed moving to IBM Toyosu Facility, Tokyo. The last IBM-related organizations left Yamato around September 2012, and the facility is no longer associated with IBM.

IBM Yamato Facility houses IBM's research and development centers in Japan. Its address is 1623-14, Shimo-tsuruma, Yamato City, Kanagawa Prefecture, Japan. Its buildings were completed in 1985.

== IBM Yamato Development Laboratory ==
=== History ===
In the 1960s, IBM started small-scale development activities in Japan, using RPQ procedure at its Special Engineering department. In 1972, IBM Japan Development Laboratory (JDL) was established in Tokyo. JDL was moved to the IBM Fujisawa Plant site in 1975, becoming IBM Fujisawa Development Laboratory (FDL). FDL was subsequently moved to the Yamato site In 1985, becoming IBM Yamato Development Laboratory (usually called Yamato Lab, not YDL), and the IBM Tokyo Programming Center (VM/Office System, Banking System, Retail System, etc.) at Kawasaki also moved here. In 1993, the IBM Tokyo Research Laboratory was also moved to Yamato. When IBM sold its Personal Computer Division to Lenovo in 2005, Yamato Lab's ThinkPad departments were separated, but remained at the Yamato site.

=== Development Lab Directors ===
The Development Lab Directors (or those who were in charge of Development & Manufacturing) were:

- Edward V. Hoffler (1971–1974)
- Nobuo Mii (1974–1977)
- Keiichiro Meigo
- Hajime Watabe
- Toshio Yasui (1987–1991)
- Kiyoji Ishida
- Tsutomu Maruyama
- Yukako Uchinaga (2004–2007)
- Yoshinori Sakaue (2007–2008)
- Kazushi Kuse (2009- )

=== Development project areas ===
Project areas that were at the IBM Yamato Facility according to IBM Japan include: server systems, storage systems, embedded hardware, communication systems, printers, retail store systems, application systems, telecommunication, Internet related, pervasive computing, finance industry systems, customer relationship management (CRM), business intelligence (BI), and technical and consulting services about hardware and software.

== IBM Tokyo Research Laboratory ==
IBM Tokyo Research Laboratory, also known as TRL, was established in 1983, as IBM's first research center in Asia. It was initially located in Tokyo, but moved to the Yamato site in 1993. It is involved in the basic researches, in association with IBM's other research centers at Yorktown Heights, New York (Thomas J. Watson Research Center); Zurich, Switzerland; etc. In 2008, there are 200 researchers.

== See also ==
- IBM
- IBM Japan, Ltd. (in Japanese)
- IBM Hakozaki Facility (Marketing)
