= IBM Rome Software Lab =

Software development facility in Italy

- Native name: IBM Tivoli Rome Laboratory
- Company type: Division
- Industry: Software development
- Founded: 1978
- Headquarters: Rome, Italy
- Area served: Worldwide
- Products: IBM Tivoli, IBM Rational, SOA
- Services: Software engineering, IT architecture
- Number of employees: 550+ (2026)
- Parent: IBM
- Divisions: IBM Software Group
- Website: www.ibm.com/it-it

The IBM Rome Software Lab (formerly known as IBM Tivoli Rome Laboratory) is one of the largest software development laboratories in Italy, and one of the largest IBM Software Group Labs in Europe.

Founded in 1978, the Rome Lab (located in Rome) now has more than 550 professionals among software developers, project managers, IT specialists, and IT architects. The main mission of the Rome Lab is focused on IBM Tivoli development, including Tivoli Configuration Manager, Tivoli Remote Control, Tivoli Workload Scheduler, and Tivoli Monitoring.

In 2004, the laboratory focused on the adoption of the IBM Rational Unified Process (RUP) in Tivoli and in the wider Software Group inside IBM. In 2007, IBM opened the "Rome SOA Leadership Center" hosted by and formed with a team of experts on service-oriented architecture (SOA) coming from the IBM Rome Software Laboratory. The Rome laboratory constantly collaborates with Italian Universities and Research Centers.

Another portion of this reality is the "Rome Solutions Lab", which includes two main areas: the "Publishing" area involved in the development, support and delivery of the IBM NICA (Networked Interactive Content Access); and the "Industry Solutions" area, an internal development organization, working on the development, support and delivery of software based on and providing extensions to IBM Software Group products.
