= IBM =

American multinational technology company

International Business Machines Corporation
- Logo since 1972, designed by Paul Rand

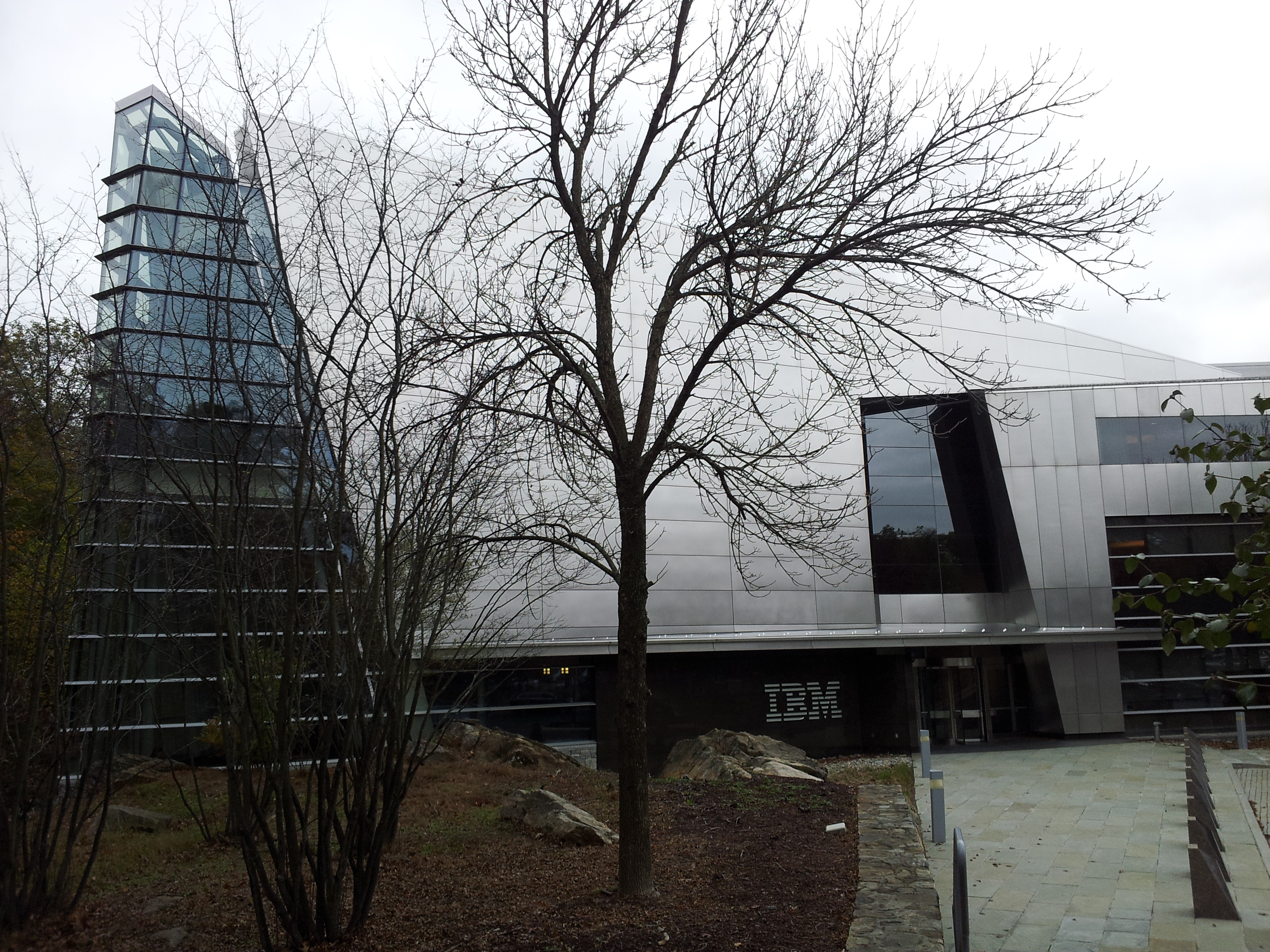
- IBM CHQ in Armonk, New York, in 2014
- Trade name: IBM
- Formerly: Computing-Tabulating-Recording Company (1911–1924)
- Type: Public
- Traded as: NYSE: IBM; DJIA component; S&P 100 component; S&P 500 component
- ISIN: ISIN: US4592001014
- Industry: Information technology
- Predecessors: Bundy Manufacturing Company; Computing Scale Company of America; International Time Recording Company; Tabulating Machine Company; Computing-Tabulating-Recording Company
- Founded: June 16, 1911; 115 years ago (as Computing-Tabulating-Recording Company); Endicott, New York, U.S.
- Founders: George Winthrop Fairchild; Charles Ranlett Flint; Herman Hollerith
- Headquarters: 1 Orchard Road, Armonk, New York, U.S.
- Area served: 170 countries
- Key people: Arvind Krishna (chairman & CEO); Gary Cohn (vice chairman)
- Products: Enterprise software; Computer hardware; Cloud computing; Artificial intelligence; Mainframes; Quantum computing
- Brands: Red Hat; Watson; Watsonx; SPSS; Cognos; WebSphere; Tivoli; ILOG; IBM Z; HashiCorp; Full list
- Services: Consulting; Software as a service; Infrastructure as a service; Managed services
- Revenue: ▲US$67.54 billion (2025)
- Operating income: ▲US$10.99 billion (2025)
- Net income: ▲US$10.59 billion (2025)
- Total assets: ▲US$151.88 billion (2025)
- Total equity: ▲US$32.74 billion (2025)
- Number of employees: 264,300 (2025)
- Website: ibm.com
- Footnotes; Financials as of December 31, 2025. References

International Business Machines Corporation (IBM) (Note: Nicknamed Big Blue) is an American multinational technology company headquartered in Armonk, New York, and present in over 175 countries. It is a publicly traded company and one of the 30 companies in the Dow Jones Industrial Average. (Note: As of 2026.) IBM is the largest industrial research organization in the world, with 19 research facilities across a dozen countries; for 29 consecutive years, from 1993 to 2021, it held the record for most annual U.S. patents generated by a business.

IBM was founded in 1911 as the Computing-Tabulating-Recording Company (CTR), a holding company of manufacturers of record-keeping and measuring systems. It was renamed "International Business Machines" in 1924 and soon became the leading manufacturer of punch-card tabulating systems. During the 1960s and 1970s, the IBM mainframe, exemplified by the System/360 and its successors, was the world's dominant computing platform, with the company producing 80 percent of computers in the U.S. and 70 percent of computers worldwide. Embracing both business and scientific computing, System/360 was the first family of computers designed to cover a complete range of applications from small to large.

IBM entered the microcomputer market in 1981 with the IBM Personal Computer; its architecture remains the basis for the majority of personal computers sold today. The company later also found success in the laptop space with the ThinkPad. Since the 1990s, IBM has concentrated on computer services, software, supercomputers, and scientific research; it sold its microcomputer division to Lenovo in 2005. IBM continues to develop mainframes, and its supercomputers have consistently ranked among the most powerful in the world in the 21st century.

As one of the world's oldest and largest technology companies, IBM has been responsible for several technological innovations, including the Automated Teller Machine (ATM), Dynamic Random-Access Memory (DRAM), the floppy disk, Generalized Markup Language, the hard disk drive, the magnetic stripe card, the relational database, the SQL programming language, and the Universal Product Code (UPC) barcode. The company has made inroads in advanced computer chips, quantum computing, artificial intelligence, and data infrastructure. IBM employees and alumni have won various recognitions for their scientific research and inventions, including six Nobel Prizes and six Turing Awards.

== History ==
Such was IBM's ubiquity it had a supporting role in this 1957 newsreel of Sputnik

=== 1910s–1950s ===
IBM originated with several technological innovations developed and commercialized in the late 19th century. Julius E. Pitrap patented the computing scale in 1894; Alexander Dey invented the dial recorder (1888); Herman Hollerith patented the Electric Tabulating Machine (1889); and Willard Bundy invented a time clock to record workers' arrival and departure times on a paper tape (1889). On June 16, 1911, their four companies were amalgamated in New York State by Charles Ranlett Flint forming a fifth company, the Computing-Tabulating-Recording Company (CTR) based in Endicott, New York. The five companies had 1,300 employees and offices and plants in Endicott and Binghamton, New York; Dayton, Ohio; Detroit, Michigan; Washington, D.C.; and Toronto, Canada.

Collectively, the companies manufactured a wide array of machinery for sale and lease, ranging from commercial scales and industrial time recorders, meat and cheese slicers, to tabulators and punched cards. Thomas J. Watson, Sr., fired from the National Cash Register Company (NCR) by John Henry Patterson, called on Flint and, in 1914, was offered a position at CTR. Watson joined CTR as general manager and then, 11 months later, was made President when antitrust cases relating to his time at NCR were resolved. Having learned Patterson's pioneering business practices, Watson proceeded to put the stamp of NCR onto CTR's companies. He implemented sales conventions, "generous sales incentives, a focus on customer service, an insistence on well-groomed, dark-suited salesmen and had an evangelical fervor for instilling company pride and loyalty in every worker". His favorite slogan, "THINK", became a mantra for each company's employees. During Watson's first four years, revenues reached $9 million ($167 million today) and the company's operations expanded to Europe, South America, Asia and Australia. Watson never liked the clumsy hyphenated name "Computing-Tabulating-Recording Company" and chose to replace it with the more expansive title "International Business Machines" which had previously been used as the name of CTR's Canadian Division; the name was changed on February 14, 1924. By 1933, most of the subsidiaries had been merged into one company, IBM.

==== World War II ====
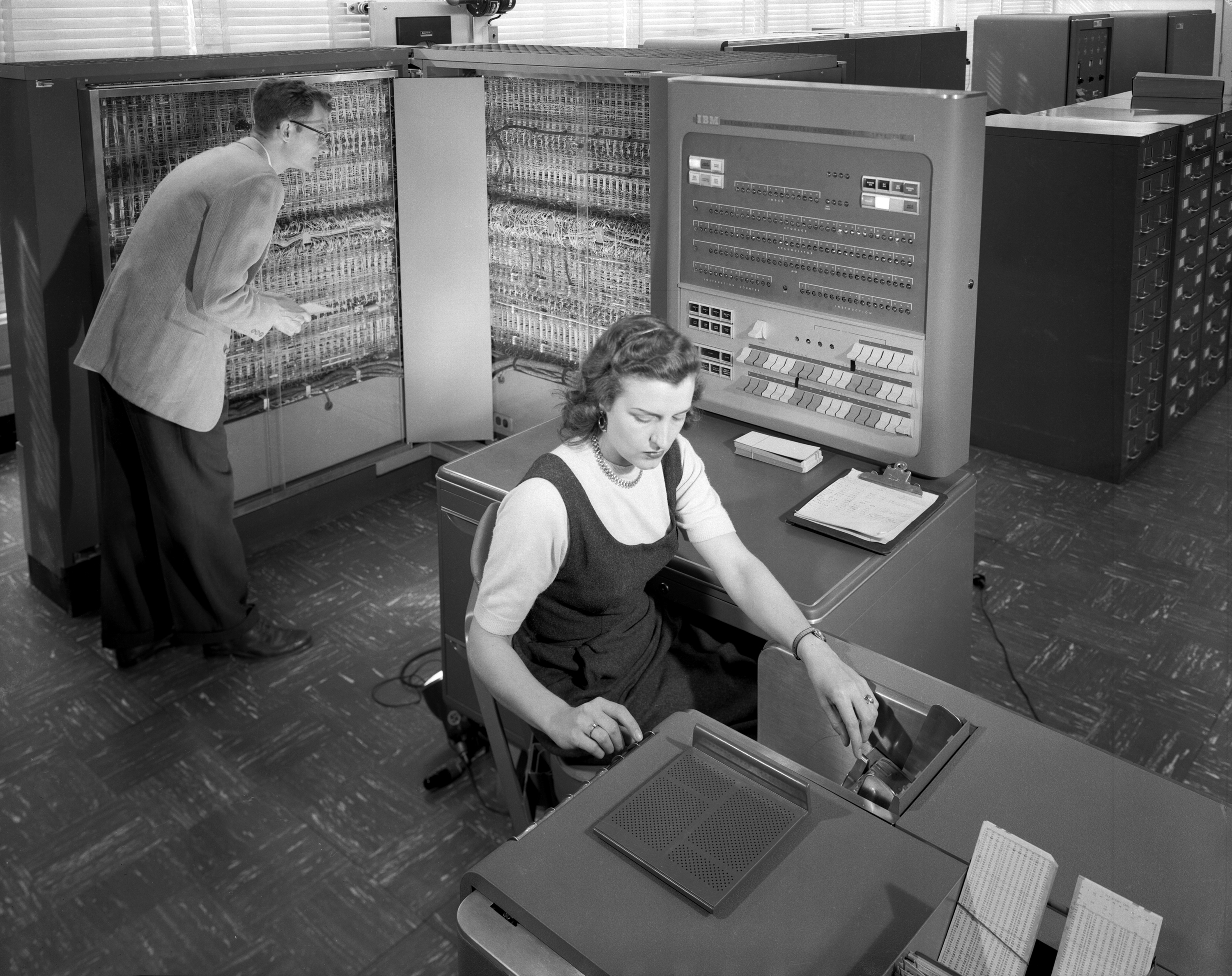
NACA researchers using an IBM type 704 electronic data processing machine in 1957

The Nazis made extensive use of Hollerith punch card and alphabetical accounting equipment and IBM's majority-owned German subsidiary, Deutsche Hollerith Maschinen GmbH (Dehomag), supplied this equipment from the early 1930s. This equipment was critical to Nazi efforts to categorize citizens of both Germany and other nations that fell under Nazi control through ongoing censuses. These census data were used to facilitate the round-up of Jews and other targeted groups, and to catalog their movements through the machinery of the Holocaust, including internment in the concentration camps. Edwin Black contends in IBM and the Holocaust that IBM's dealings with Nazis through its New York City headquarters persisted during World War II. Nazi concentration camps operated a Hollerith department called Hollerith Abteilung, which had IBM machines, including calculating and sorting machines.

In 1944, IBM completed the Automatic Sequence Controlled Calculator, a programmable electromechanical computer that aided in US and Allied weapons research and development applications, including for the Manhattan Project. As a military contractor, IBM also produced 346,500 M1 carbines, or about 6% of all units manufactured during World War II.

=== 1950s–1980s ===
IBM offered its first commercial stored-program computer, the vacuum tube based IBM 701, in 1952. The IBM 305 RAMAC introduced the hard disk drive in 1956. The company switched to transistorized designs with the 7000 and 1400 series, beginning in 1958. The 1400 series was the first to deploy over 10000 units, making it its most successful computer device at the time.

In 1956, the company demonstrated the first practical example of artificial intelligence when Arthur L. Samuel of IBM's Poughkeepsie, New York, laboratory programmed an IBM 704 not merely to play checkers but "learn" from its own experience. In 1957, the FORTRAN scientific programming language was announced.

In 1961, IBM developed the SABRE reservation system for American Airlines and introduced the highly successful Selectric typewriter. Also in 1961, IBM used the IBM 7094 to generate the first song sung completely by a computer using synthesizers. The song was Daisy Bell (Bicycle Built for Two). The recording is now in the United States National Recording Registry.

In 1963, IBM employees and computers helped NASA track the orbital flights of the Mercury astronauts. A year later, it moved its corporate headquarters from New York City to Armonk, New York. The latter half of the 1960s saw IBM continue its support of space exploration, participating in the 1965 Gemini flights, 1966 Saturn flights, and 1969 lunar mission. IBM also developed and manufactured the Saturn V's Instrument Unit and Apollo spacecraft guidance computers.

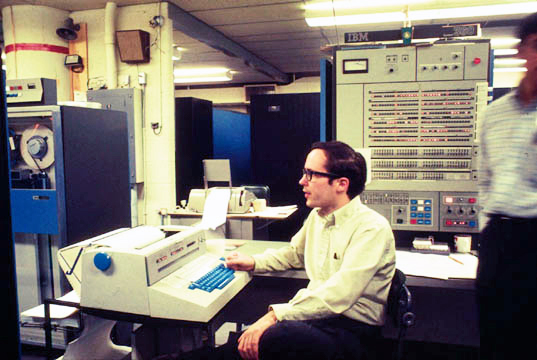
An IBM System/360 in use at the University of Michigan c. 1969

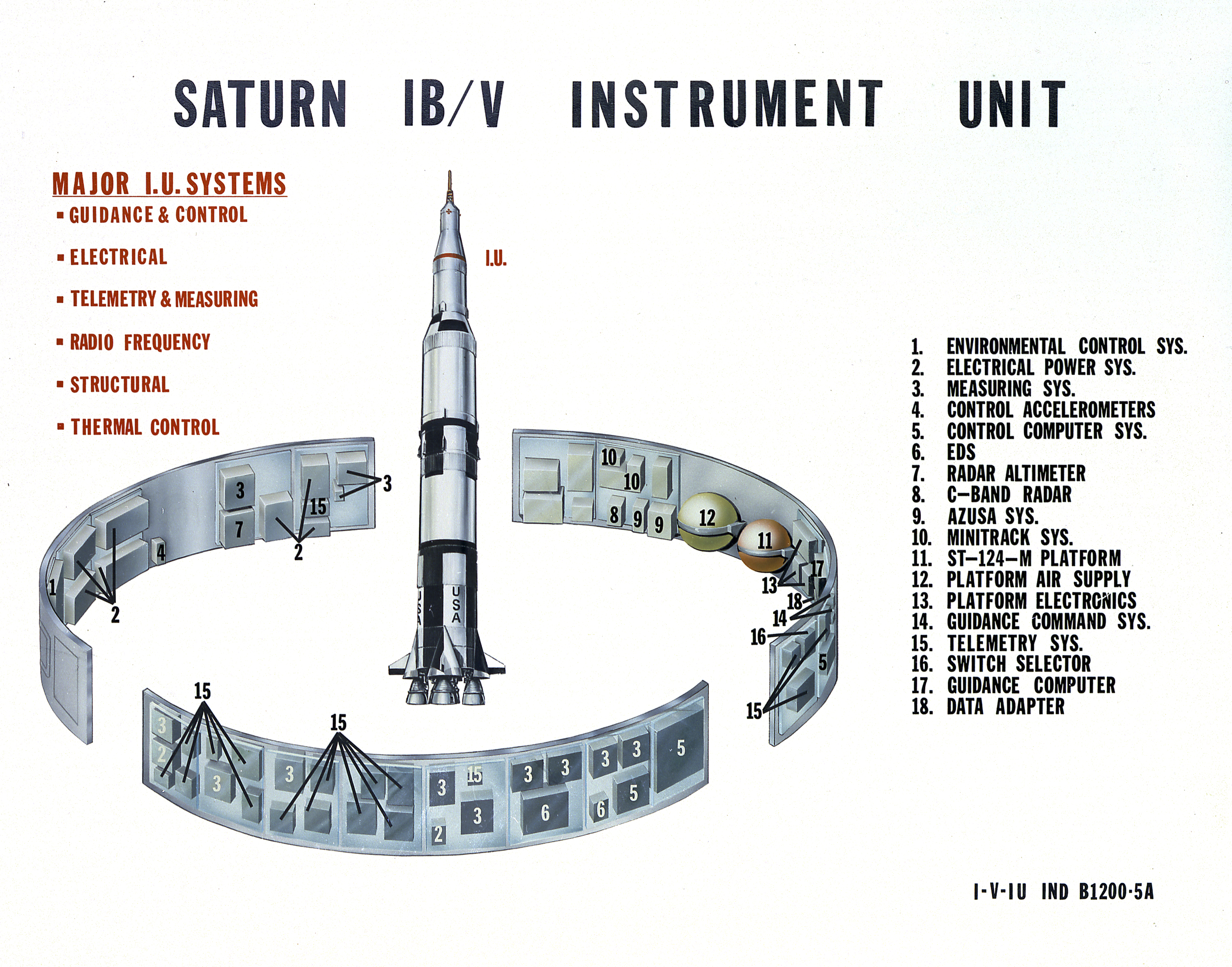
IBM guidance computer hardware for the Saturn V Instrument Unit

On April 7, 1964, IBM launched the first computer system family, the IBM System/360. It spanned the complete range of commercial and scientific applications from large to small, allowing companies for the first time to upgrade to models with greater computing capability without having to rewrite their applications. It was followed by the IBM System/370 in 1970. Together the 360 and 370 made the IBM mainframe the dominant mainframe computer and the dominant computing platform in the industry throughout this period and into the early 1980s. They and the operating systems that ran on them such as OS/VS1 and MVS, and the middleware built on top of those such as the CICS transaction processing monitor, had a near-monopoly-level market share and became the thing IBM was most known for during this period.

In 1969, the United States of America alleged that IBM violated the Sherman Antitrust Act by monopolizing or attempting to monopolize the general-purpose electronic digital computer system market, specifically computers designed primarily for business, and subsequently alleged that IBM violated the antitrust laws in IBM's actions directed against leasing companies and plug-compatible peripheral manufacturers. Shortly after, IBM unbundled its software and services in what many observers believed was a direct result of the lawsuit, creating a competitive market for software. In 1982, the Department of Justice dropped the case as "without merit".

Also in 1969, IBM engineer Forrest Parry invented the magnetic stripe card that would become ubiquitous for credit/debit/ATM cards, driver's licenses, rapid transit cards and a multitude of other identity and access control applications. IBM pioneered the manufacture of these cards, and for most of the 1970s, the data processing systems and software for such applications ran exclusively on IBM computers. In 1974, IBM engineer George J. Laurer developed the Universal Product Code. IBM and the World Bank first introduced financial swaps to the public in 1981, when it entered into a swap agreement.

In the early 1970s, the Examination Department of the South Vietnamese Ministry of Education contracted with IBM to computerize all examination records, from registration and application forms to certificates of admission and necessary statistical data. By 1974, all subjects in the South Vietnamese high school graduation exam were converted to multiple-choice questions. Answer sheets for the multiple-choice exams were ordered from the United States, and candidates' papers were graded using an IBM 1230 machine. The graded papers were then transferred to an IBM 534 machine for punching. These punched sheets were then fed into an IBM 360 machine to read the scores, multiply by coefficients, add up the scores, calculate the average score, standard deviation, convert raw scores to standardized scores, and calculate the admission ranking. The sample group and norm group were carefully selected according to statistical methods to calculate the average score and standard deviation.

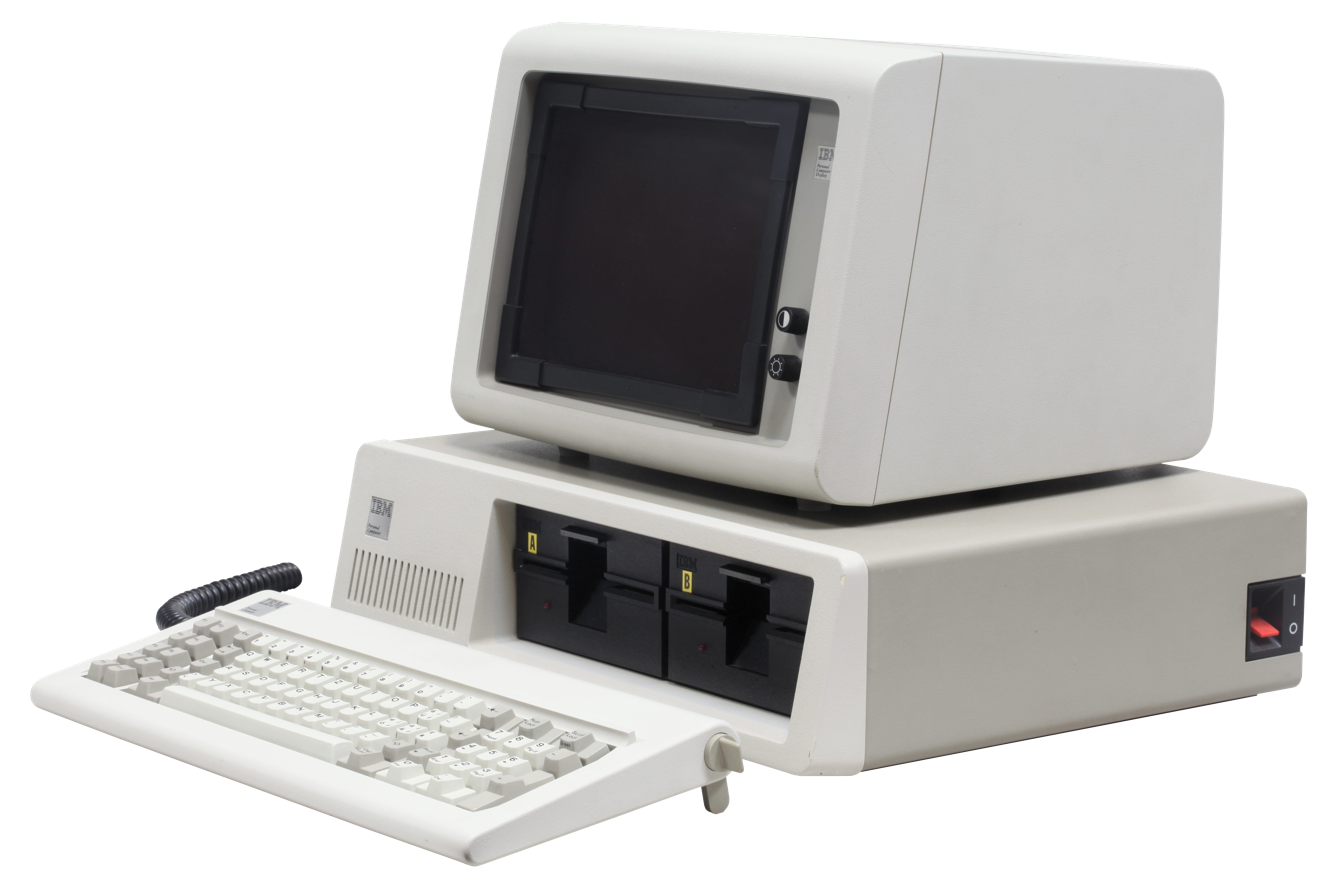
The IBM Personal Computer (pictured) became one of IBM's best selling products and has had a wide influence on personal computing since its release in 1981.

IBM entered the microcomputer market in the 1980s with the IBM Personal Computer (IBM 5150). The computer, which spawned a long line of successors, had a profound influence on the development of the personal computer market and became one of IBM's best selling products of all time. The PC was not well protected by intellectual property laws. As a consequence, IBM quickly began losing its market dominance to emerging, compatible competitors in the PC market. Experts debate whether this was an early example of successful adoption of open architecture, or a lack of business foresight by IBM.

In 1985, IBM collaborated with Microsoft to develop a new operating system, which was released as OS/2. Following a dispute, Microsoft severed the collaboration and IBM continued development of OS/2 on its own but it failed in the marketplace against Microsoft's Windows during the mid-1990s.

=== 1990s–2000s ===
In 1991, IBM began spinning off its many divisions into autonomous subsidiaries (so-called "Baby Blues") in an attempt to make the company more manageable and to streamline IBM by having other investors finance those companies. These included AdStar, dedicated to disk drives and other data storage products; IBM Application Business Systems, dedicated to mid-range computers; IBM Enterprise Systems, dedicated to mainframes; Pennant Systems, dedicated to mid-range and large printers; Lexmark, dedicated to small printers; and more. Lexmark was acquired by Clayton & Dubilier in a leveraged buyout shortly after its formation.

In 1997, Deep Blue, a chess computer created by IBM beat Chess World Champion at the time, Garry Kasparov in a six round match following standard tournament rules.

In September 1992, IBM finished spinning off its various microcomputer personal computer manufacturing divisions and were consolidated into an autonomous wholly owned subsidiary known as the IBM Personal Computer Company (IBM PC Co.). This corporate restructuring came after IBM reported a sharp drop in profit margins during the second quarter of fiscal year 1992; market analysts attributed the drop to a fierce price war in the personal computer market over the summer of 1992. The corporate restructuring was one of the largest and most expensive in history up to that point. By the summer of 1993, the IBM PC Co. had divided into multiple business units itself, including Ambra Computer Corporation and the IBM Power Personal Systems Group, the former an attempt to design and market "clone" computers of IBM's own architecture and the latter responsible for IBM's PowerPC-based workstations. IBM PC Co. introduced the ThinkPad clone computers, which IBM would heavily market and would eventually become one of the best-selling series of notebook computers.

In 1993, IBM posted an $8 billion loss – at the time the biggest in American corporate history. Lou Gerstner was hired as CEO from RJR Nabisco to turn the company around. In 1995, IBM purchased Lotus Development Corporation, best known for its Lotus 1-2-3 spreadsheet software. During the decade, IBM was working on a new operating system, named the Workplace OS project. Despite a large amount of money spent on the project, it was cancelled in 1996.

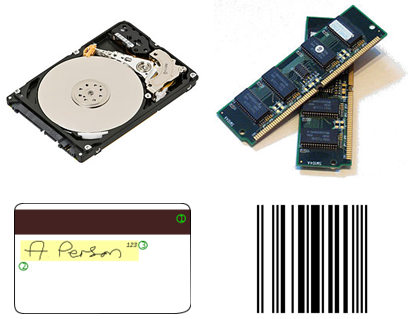
IBM inventions (clockwise from top-left): the hard-disk drive, DRAM, the UPC bar code, and the magnetic stripe card

In 1998, IBM merged the enterprise-oriented Personal Systems Group of the IBM PC Co. into IBM's own Global Services personal computer consulting and customer service division. The resulting merged business units then became known simply as IBM Personal Systems Group. A year later, IBM stopped selling its computers at retail outlets after its market share in this sector had fallen considerably behind competitors Compaq and Dell. Immediately afterwards, the IBM PC Co. was dissolved and merged into IBM Personal Systems Group.

In the 2000s, IBM collaborated with the Chinese defense contractor Huadi to develop the "Golden Shield Project", a large-scale policing and surveillance project in Beijing. The system was reportedly used to monitor online activity and target groups such as Falun Gong, Uyghurs and other individuals considered security risks.

In 2002, IBM acquired PwC Consulting, the consulting arm of PwC which was merged into its IBM Global Services. On September 14, 2004, LG and IBM announced that their business alliance in the South Korean market would end at the end of that year. Both companies stated that it was unrelated to the charges of bribery earlier that year. Xnote was originally part of the joint venture and was sold by LG in 2012.

Continuing a trend started in the 1990s of downsizing its operations and divesting from commodity production, IBM sold all of its personal computer business to Chinese technology company Lenovo, and in 2009, it acquired software company SPSS Inc. Later in 2009, IBM's Blue Gene supercomputing program was awarded the National Medal of Technology and Innovation by U.S. President Barack Obama.

=== 2010s–present ===
In 2011, an IBM-owned artificial intelligence program called Watson was exhibited on Jeopardy! where it won against game-show champions Ken Jennings and Brad Rutter. The company also celebrated its 100th anniversary in the same year on June 16. In 2012, IBM announced it had agreed to buy Kenexa and Texas Memory Systems, and a year later it also acquired SoftLayer Technologies, a web hosting service, in a deal worth around $2 billion. Also that year, the company designed a video surveillance system for Davao City.

In 2014, IBM announced it would sell its x86 server division to Lenovo for $2.1 billion while continuing to offer Power ISA-based servers. Also that year, IBM began announcing several major partnerships with other companies, including Apple Inc., Twitter, Facebook, Tencent, Cisco, UnderArmour, Box, Microsoft, VMware, CSC, Macy's, Sesame Workshop, the parent company of Sesame Street, and Salesforce.com.

In 2015, its chip division transitioned to a fabless model with semiconductors design, offloading manufacturing to GlobalFoundries.

In 2015, IBM announced three major acquisitions: Merge Healthcare for $1 billion, data storage vendor Cleversafe, and all digital assets from The Weather Company, including Weather.com and The Weather Channel mobile app. Also that year, IBM employees created the film A Boy and His Atom, which was the first molecule movie to tell a story. In 2016, IBM acquired video conferencing service Ustream and formed a new cloud video unit. In April 2016, it posted a 14-year low in quarterly sales. The following month, Groupon sued IBM accusing it of patent infringement, two months after IBM accused Groupon of patent infringement in a separate lawsuit.

In 2016, IBM acquired Truven Health Analytics for $2.6 billion, as the company expanded into healthcare analytics and artificial intelligence.

IBM announced its acquisition of Red Hat for $34 billion in October 2018 and completed the deal in July 2019. As the largest acquisition in IBM's history, the deal became central to the company's strategy in hybrid cloud computing and was later credited as the central catalyst behind the growth of its cloud business.

In February 2020, IBM's John Kelly III joined Brad Smith of Microsoft to sign a pledge with the Vatican to ensure the ethical use and practice of Artificial Intelligence (AI).

IBM announced in October 2020 that it would divest the Managed Infrastructure Services unit of its Global Technology Services division into a new public company. The new company, Kyndryl, will have 90,000 employees, 4,600 clients in 115 countries, with an order backlog of $60 billion. IBM's spin-off was greater than any of its previous divestitures, and welcomed by investors. IBM appointed Martin Schroeter, who had been IBM's CFO from 2014 through the end of 2017, as CEO of Kyndryl.

In 2021, IBM announced the acquisition of the enterprise software company Turbonomic for $1.5 billion. In January 2022, IBM announced it would sell Watson Health to private equity firm Francisco Partners.

On March 7, 2022, a few days after the start of the Russian invasion of Ukraine, IBM CEO Arvind Krishna announced that "we have suspended all business in Russia". All Russian articles were also removed from the IBM website. On June 7, Krishna announced that IBM would carry out an "orderly wind-down" of its operations in Russia.

In late 2022, IBM started a collaboration with new Japanese manufacturer Rapidus, which led GlobalFoundries to file a lawsuit against IBM the following year.

In 2023, IBM acquired Manta Software Inc. to complement its data and A.I. governance capabilities for an undisclosed amount. On November 16, 2023, IBM suspended ads on Twitter after ads were found next to pro-Nazi content.

In August 2023, IBM agreed to sell The Weather Company to Francisco Partners for an undisclosed sum. The sale was finalized on February 1, 2024, and the price was disclosed as $1.1 billion, with $750 million in cash, $100 million deferred over seven years, and $250 million in contingent consideration.

In December 2023, IBM announced it would acquire Software AG's StreamSets and webMethods platforms for €2.13 billion ($2.33 billion).

On December 8, 2025, IBM announced a deal to acquire data-infrastructure company Confluent for approximately $11 billion. The deal closed in March 2026 and was expected to help further advance the company's interests in AI.

On June 25, 2026, IBM unveiled the world's first technology capable of producing chips smaller than 1 nanometer.

On July 23, 2026, IBM entered into a definitive agreement to acquire HRL Laboratories from its joint owners, Boeing and General Motors, for an undisclosed sum. Under the agreement, IBM will integrate HRL's expertise in silicon-spin qubit engineering, quantum sensing, and cryogenics into its quantum computing development, while Boeing and GM will continue partnering with IBM on quantum applications.

== Corporate affairs ==
=== Business trends ===
IBM's market capitalization was valued at over $153 billion as of May 2024. Despite its relative decline within the technology sector, IBM remains the seventh largest technology company by revenue, and 68th largest overall company by revenue in the United States. IBM ranked No. 38 on the 2020 Fortune 500 rankings of the largest United States corporations by total revenue. In 2014, IBM was accused of using "financial engineering" to hit its quarterly earnings targets rather than investing for the longer term. In 2018, IBM along with 91 additional Fortune 500 companies had "paid an effective federal tax rate of 0% or less". IBM Q1 2024 revenue alone was $14.5 billion, up 1% year-over-year. The company's software revenue was up 5% with strong performance in hybrid cloud and AI. The full FY2024 figure and FY2024 figure and FY2025 quarterly results need updating throughout the article.

The key trends of IBM are (as at the financial year ending December 31):

Year	Revenue (US$ bn)	Net income (US$ bn)	Employees
2014	92.7	12.0	379,592
2015	81.7	13.1	377,757
2016	79.9	11.8	380,300
2017	79.1	5.7	366,600
2018	79.5	8.7	350,600
2019	77.1	9.4	352,600
2020	73.6	5.5	345,900
2021 (Note: IBM's financial statements from the 2021 annual report have adjusted revenue, income numbers, employee count for the previous years to account for discontinued operations related to the separation of Kyndryl.)	57.3	5.7	282,100
2022	60.5	1.6	288,300
2023	61.8	7.5	282,200
2024	62.8	6.0	270,300

=== Board and shareholders ===
The company's 15-member board of directors are responsible for overall corporate management and includes the current or former CEOs of Anthem, Dow Chemical, Johnson and Johnson, Royal Dutch Shell, UPS, and Vanguard as well as the president of Cornell University and a retired U.S. Navy admiral. Vanguard Group is the largest shareholder of IBM and as of March 31, 2023, held 15.7% of total shares outstanding.

In 2011, IBM became the first technology company Warren Buffett's holding company Berkshire Hathaway invested in. Initially he bought 64 million shares costing $10.5 billion. Over the years, Buffett increased his IBM holdings, but by the end of 2017 had reduced them by 94.5% to 2.05 million shares; by May 2018, he was completely out of IBM.

=== Headquarters and offices ===
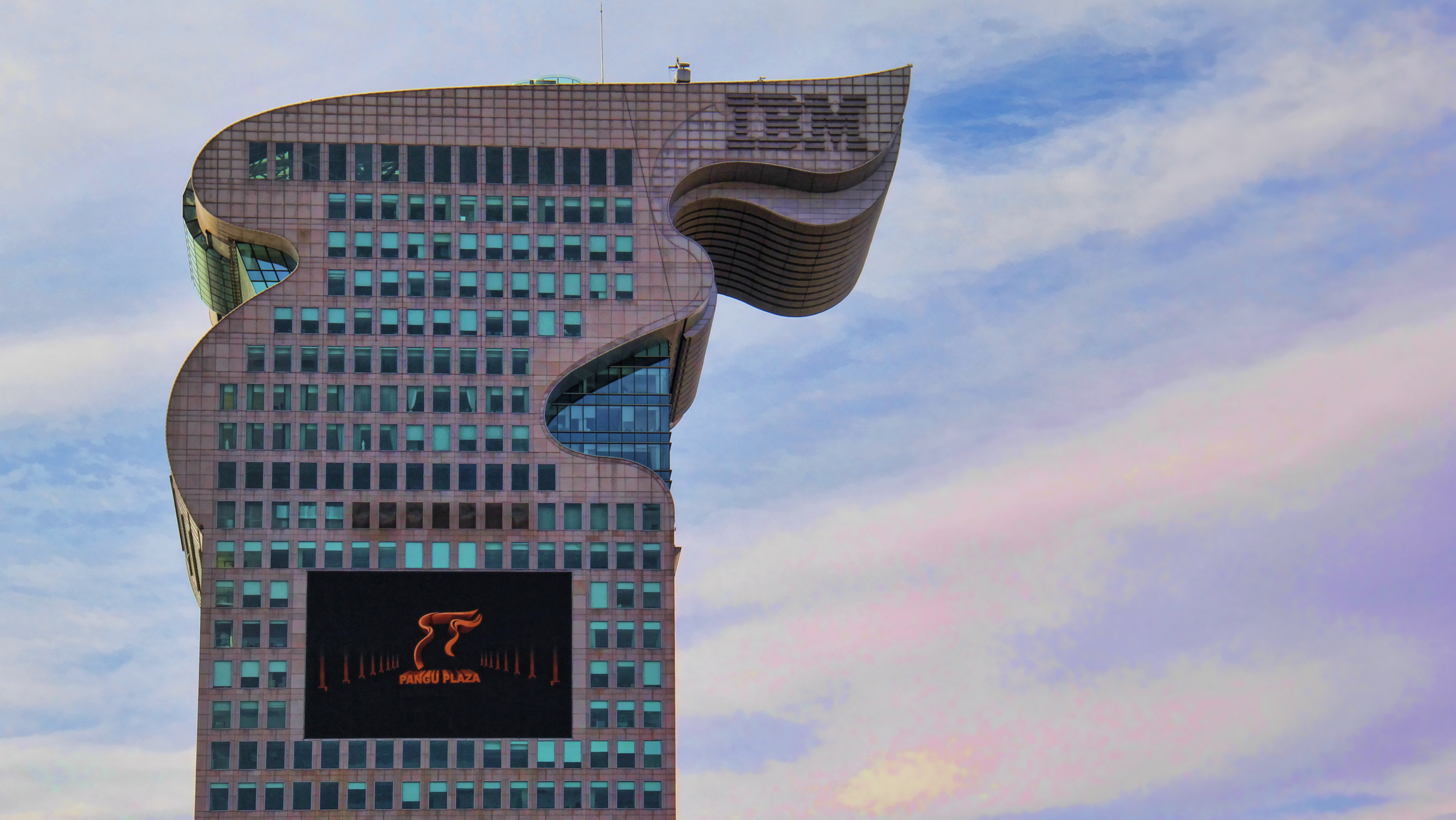
Pangu Plaza, one of IBM's offices in Beijing, China

IBM is headquartered in Armonk, New York, a community 37 miles (60 km) north of Midtown Manhattan. A nickname for the company is the "Colossus of Armonk". Its principal building, referred to as CHQ, is a 283,000-square-foot (26,300 m^{2}) glass and stone edifice on a 25-acre (10 ha) parcel amid a 432-acre former apple orchard the company purchased in the mid-1950s. There are two other IBM buildings within walking distance of CHQ: the North Castle office, which previously served as IBM's headquarters; and the Louis V. Gerstner, Jr., Center for Learning (formerly known as IBM Learning Center (ILC)), a resort hotel and training center, which has 182 guest rooms, 31 meeting rooms, and various amenities.

IBM operates in more than 175 countries as of 2025, with mobility centers in smaller market areas and major campuses in the larger ones. In New York City, IBM has several offices besides CHQ, including the IBM Watson headquarters at Astor Place in Manhattan. Outside of New York, major campuses in the United States include Austin, Texas; Research Triangle Park (Raleigh-Durham), North Carolina; Rochester, Minnesota; and Silicon Valley, California.

IBM's real estate holdings are varied and globally diverse. Towers occupied by IBM include 1250 René-Lévesque (Montreal, Canada) and One Atlantic Center (Atlanta, Georgia, US). In Beijing, China, IBM occupies Pangu Plaza, the city's seventh tallest building and overlooking Beijing National Stadium ("Bird's Nest"), home to the 2008 Summer Olympics.

IBM India Private Limited is the Indian subsidiary of IBM, which is headquartered at Bangalore, Karnataka. It has facilities in Coimbatore, Chennai, Kochi, Ahmedabad, Delhi, Kolkata, Mumbai, Pune, Gurugram, Noida, Bhubaneshwar, Surat, Visakhapatnam, Hyderabad, Bangalore and Jamshedpur.

Other notable buildings include the IBM Rome Software Lab (Rome, Italy), Hursley House (Winchester, UK), 330 North Wabash (Chicago, Illinois, United States), the Cambridge Scientific Center (Cambridge, Massachusetts, United States), the IBM Toronto Software Lab (Toronto, Canada), the IBM Building, Johannesburg (Johannesburg, South Africa), the IBM Building (Seattle) (Seattle, Washington, United States), the IBM Hakozaki Facility (Tokyo, Japan), the IBM Yamato Facility (Yamato, Japan), the IBM Canada Head Office Building (Ontario, Canada) and the Watson IoT Headquarters (Munich, Germany). Defunct IBM campuses include the IBM Somers Office Complex (Somers, New York), Spango Valley (Greenock, Scotland), and Tour Descartes (Paris, France). The company's contributions to industrial architecture and design include works by Marcel Breuer, Eero Saarinen, Ludwig Mies van der Rohe, I.M. Pei and Ricardo Legorreta. Van der Rohe's building in Chicago was recognized with the 1990 Honor Award from the National Building Museum.

In 2004, concerns were raised related to IBM's contribution in its early days to pollution in its original location in Endicott, New York. IBM reported its total CO2e emissions (direct and indirect) for the twelve months ending December 31, 2020, at 621 kilotons (-324 /-34.3% year-on-year). In February 2021, IBM committed to achieve net zero greenhouse gas emissions by the year 2030. However, there is no evidence that IBM has actually made any substantial changes to actually do so.

== Products ==
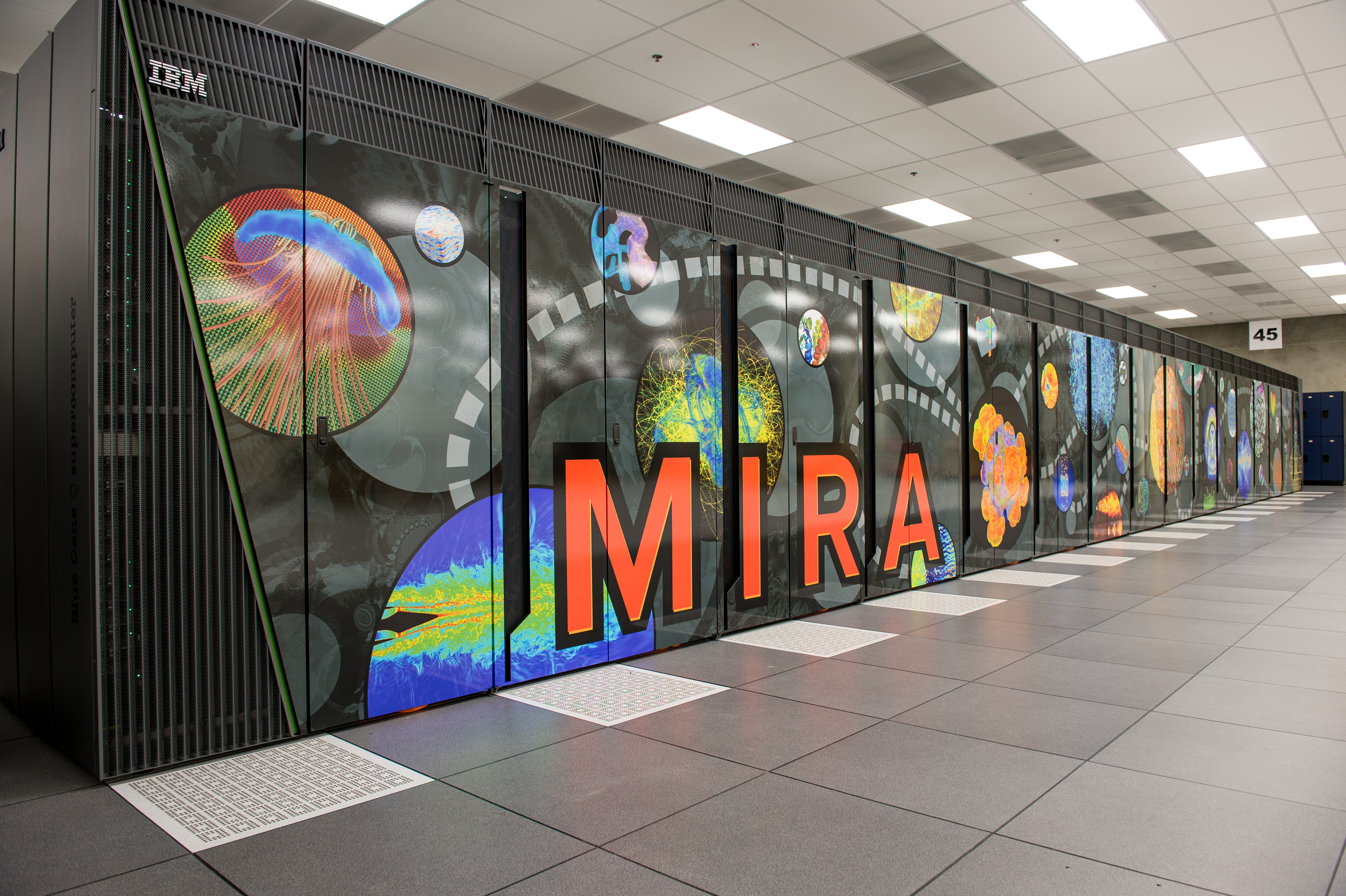
Blue Gene was awarded the National Medal of Technology and Innovation in 2009.

IBM has a large and diverse portfolio of products and services. As of 2016, these offerings fall into the categories of cloud computing, artificial intelligence, commerce, data and analytics, Internet of things (IoT), IT infrastructure, mobile, digital workplace and cybersecurity.

=== Hardware ===
==== Mainframe computers ====
Since 1954, IBM has sold mainframe computers, the latest being the IBM z series. The most recent model, the IBM z17, was released in 2025.

==== Microprocessors ====
In 1990, IBM released the Power microprocessors, which were designed into many console gaming systems, including Xbox 360, PlayStation 3, and Nintendo's Wii U. IBM Secure Blue is encryption hardware that can be built into microprocessors, and in 2014, the company revealed TrueNorth, a neuromorphic CMOS integrated circuit and announced a $3 billion investment over the following five years to design a neural chip that mimics the human brain, with 10 billion neurons and 100 trillion synapses, but that uses just 1 kilowatt of power. In 2016, the company launched all-flash arrays designed for small and midsized companies, which includes software for data compression, provisioning, and snapshots across various systems.

==== Quantum computing ====
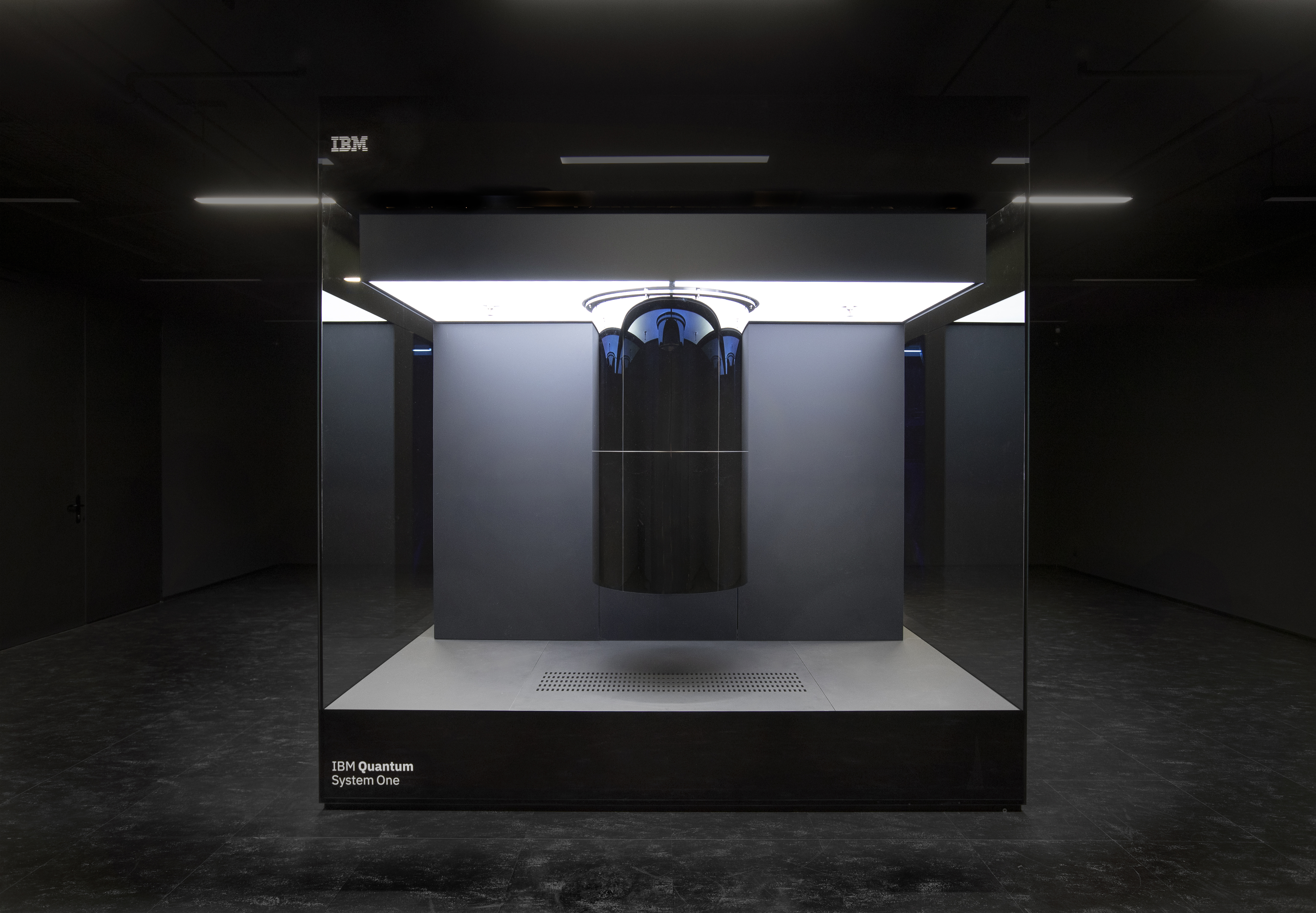
IBM Q System One (2019), the first circuit-based commercial quantum computer

In January 2019, IBM introduced its first commercial quantum computer: IBM Q System One. In March 2020, it was announced that IBM would build Europe's first quantum data center in Ehningen, Germany. The center, operated by the Fraunhofer Society, was opened in 2024.

=== Software ===
Since 2009, IBM has owned SPSS, a software package used for statistical analysis in the social sciences. IBM also owned The Weather Company, which provides weather forecasting and includes weather.com and Weather Underground, which was sold in 2024.

=== Cloud services ===
IBM Cloud includes infrastructure as a service (IaaS), software as a service (SaaS) and platform as a service (PaaS) offered through public, private and hybrid cloud delivery models. IBM SoftLayer is a dedicated server, managed hosting and cloud computing provider, which in 2011 reported hosting more than 81,000 servers for more than 26,000 customers. IBM also provides Cloud Data Encryption Services (ICDES), using cryptographic splitting to secure customer data.

In May 2022, IBM announced the company had signed a multi-year Strategic Collaboration Agreement with Amazon Web Services to make a wide variety of IBM software available as a service on AWS Marketplace. Additionally, the deal includes both companies making joint investments that make it easier for companies to consume IBM's offering and integrate them with AWS, including developer training and software development for select markets.

=== Artificial intelligence ===
IBM Watson is a technology platform that uses natural language processing and machine learning to reveal insights from large amounts of unstructured data. Watson was debuted in 2011 on the American game show Jeopardy!, where it competed against champions Ken Jennings and Brad Rutter in a three-game tournament and won. Watson has since been applied to business, healthcare, developers, and universities. For example, IBM has partnered with Memorial Sloan Kettering Cancer Center to assist with considering treatment options for oncology patients and for doing melanoma screenings. Several companies use Watson for call centers, either replacing or assisting customer service agents.

IBM also provides infrastructure for the New York City Police Department through its IBM Cognos Analytics to perform data visualizations of CompStat crime data.

In June 2020, IBM announced that it was exiting the facial recognition business. In a letter to congress, IBM's Chief Executive Officer Arvind Krishna told lawmakers, "now is the time to begin a national dialogue on whether and how facial recognition technology should be employed by domestic law enforcement agencies."

In May 2023, IBM revealed Watsonx, a Generative AI toolkit that is powered by IBM's own Granite models with option to use other publicly available LLMs. Watsonx has multiple services for training and fine tuning models based on confidential data. A year later, IBM open-sourced Granite code models and put them on Hugging Face for public use. In October 2024, IBM introduced Granite 3.0, an open-source large language model designed for enterprise AI applications.

=== Consulting ===
With 160,000 consultants globally as of 2024, IBM is one of the ten largest consulting companies in the world, with capabilities spanning strategy and management consulting, experience design, technology and systems integration, and operations. IBM's consulting business was valued at $20 billion, as of 2024.

== Research ==
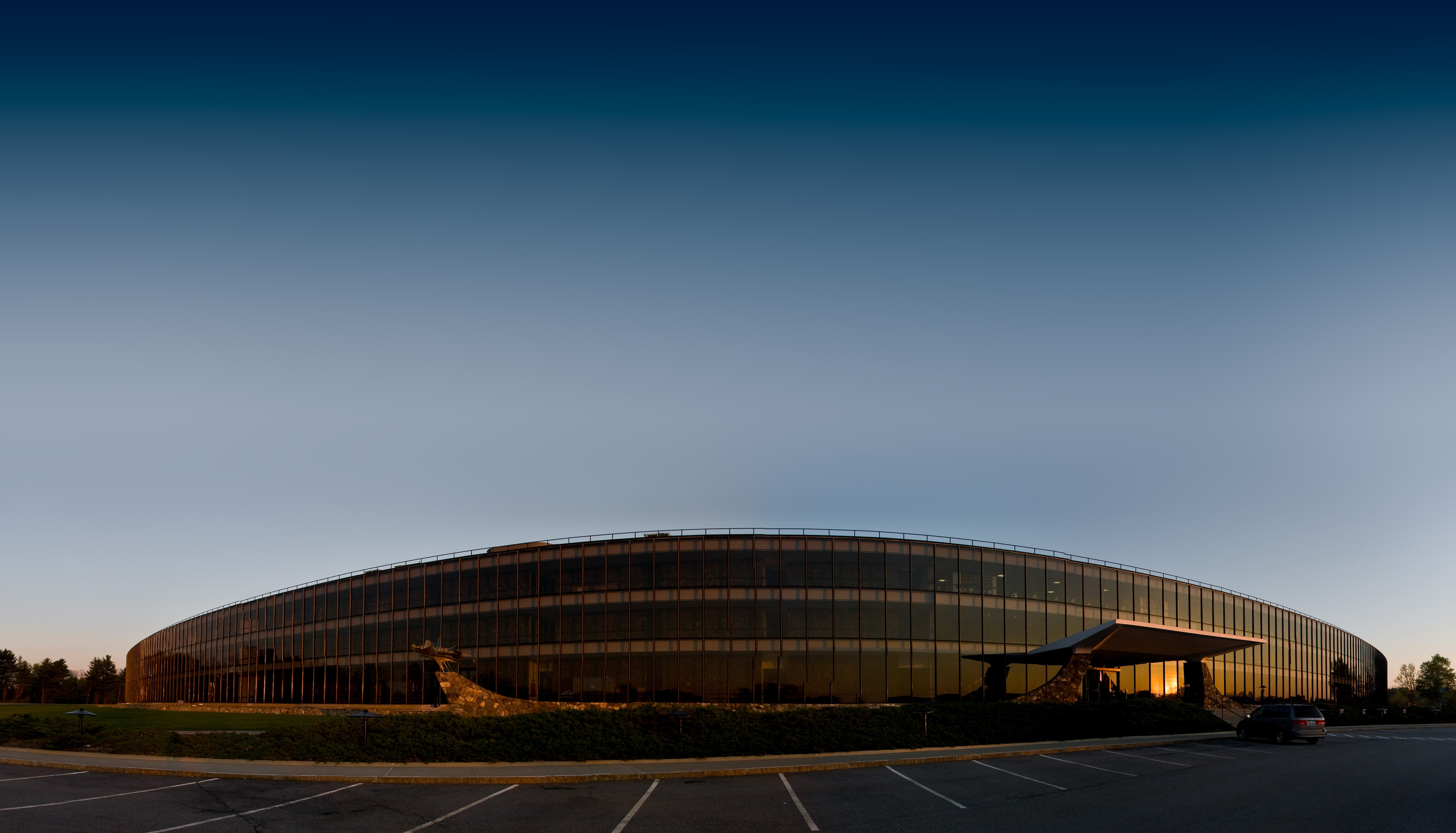
The Thomas J. Watson Research Center in Yorktown Heights, New York, is one of 11 IBM research labs worldwide.

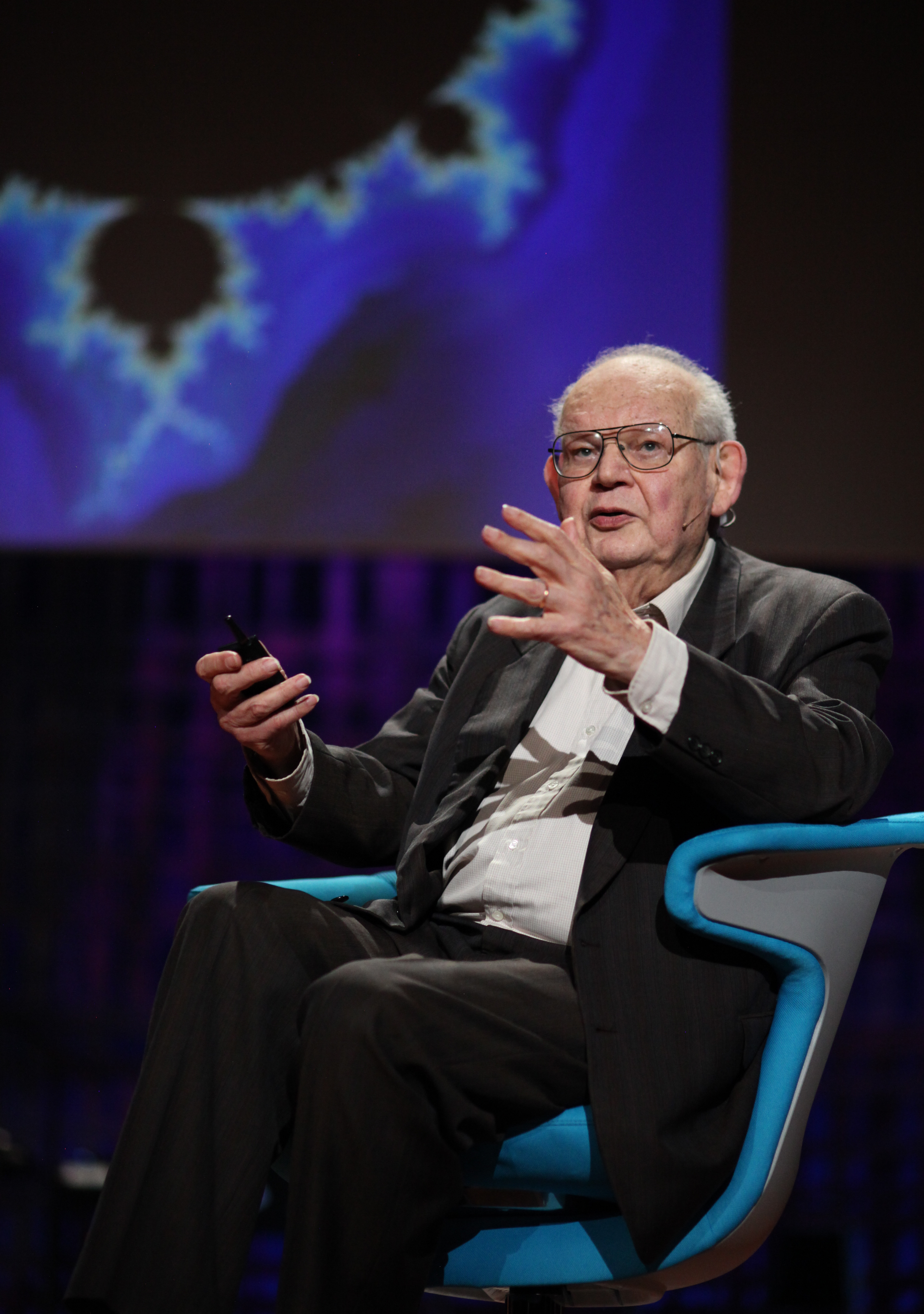
Benoit Mandelbrot, an IBM Fellow, discusses fractal geometry, 2010.

Research has been part of IBM since its founding, and its organized efforts trace their roots back to 1945, when the Watson Scientific Computing Laboratory was founded at Columbia University in New York City, converting a renovated fraternity house on Manhattan's West Side into IBM's first laboratory. Now, IBM Research constitutes the largest industrial research organization in the world, with 12 labs on 6 continents. IBM Research is headquartered at the Thomas J. Watson Research Center in New York, and facilities include the Almaden lab in California, Austin lab in Texas, Australia lab in Melbourne, Brazil lab in São Paulo and Rio de Janeiro, China lab in Beijing and Shanghai, Ireland lab in Dublin, Haifa lab in Israel, India lab in Delhi and Bangalore, Tokyo lab, Zurich lab and Africa lab in Nairobi.

In terms of investment, IBM's R&D expenditure totals several billion dollars each year. In 2012, that expenditure was approximately $6.9 billion. Recent allocations have included $1 billion to create a business unit for Watson in 2014, and $3 billion to create a next-gen semiconductor along with $4 billion towards growing the company's "strategic imperatives" (cloud, analytics, mobile, security, social) in 2015. In 2024, IBM reported research and development expenditures of $7.48 billion, representing an increase of approximately 10.3% compared to the previous year’s expenditure of $6.78 billion.

IBM has been a leading proponent of the Open Source Initiative, and began supporting Linux in 1998. The company invests billions of dollars in services and software based on Linux through the IBM Linux Technology Center, which includes over 300 Linux kernel developers. IBM has also released code under different open-source licenses, such as the platform-independent software framework Eclipse (worth approximately $40 million at the time of the donation), the three-sentence International Components for Unicode (ICU) license, and the Java-based relational database management system (RDBMS) Apache Derby. IBM's open source involvement has not been trouble-free, however (see SCO v. IBM).

Famous inventions and developments by IBM include: the automated teller machine (ATM), Dynamic Random Access Memory (DRAM), the electronic keypunch, the financial swap, the floppy disk, the hard disk drive, the magnetic stripe card, the relational database, RISC, the SABRE airline reservation system, SQL, the Universal Product Code (UPC) bar code, and the virtual machine. Additionally, in 1990 company scientists used a scanning tunneling microscope to arrange 35 individual xenon atoms to spell out the company initialism, marking the first structure assembled one atom at a time. A major part of IBM research is the generation of patents. Since its first patent for a traffic signaling device, IBM has been one of the world's most prolific patent sources. In 2021, the company held the record for most patents generated by a business for 29 consecutive years for the achievement.

=== Patents ===
As of 2022, IBM held 150,000 patents. In 2021, it held the record for most annual U.S. patents generated by a business for 29 consecutive years.

In 2001, IBM became the first company to generate more than 3,000 patents in one year, beating this record in 2008 with over 4,000 patents. IBM has also been criticized as being a patent troll.

== Brand and reputation ==
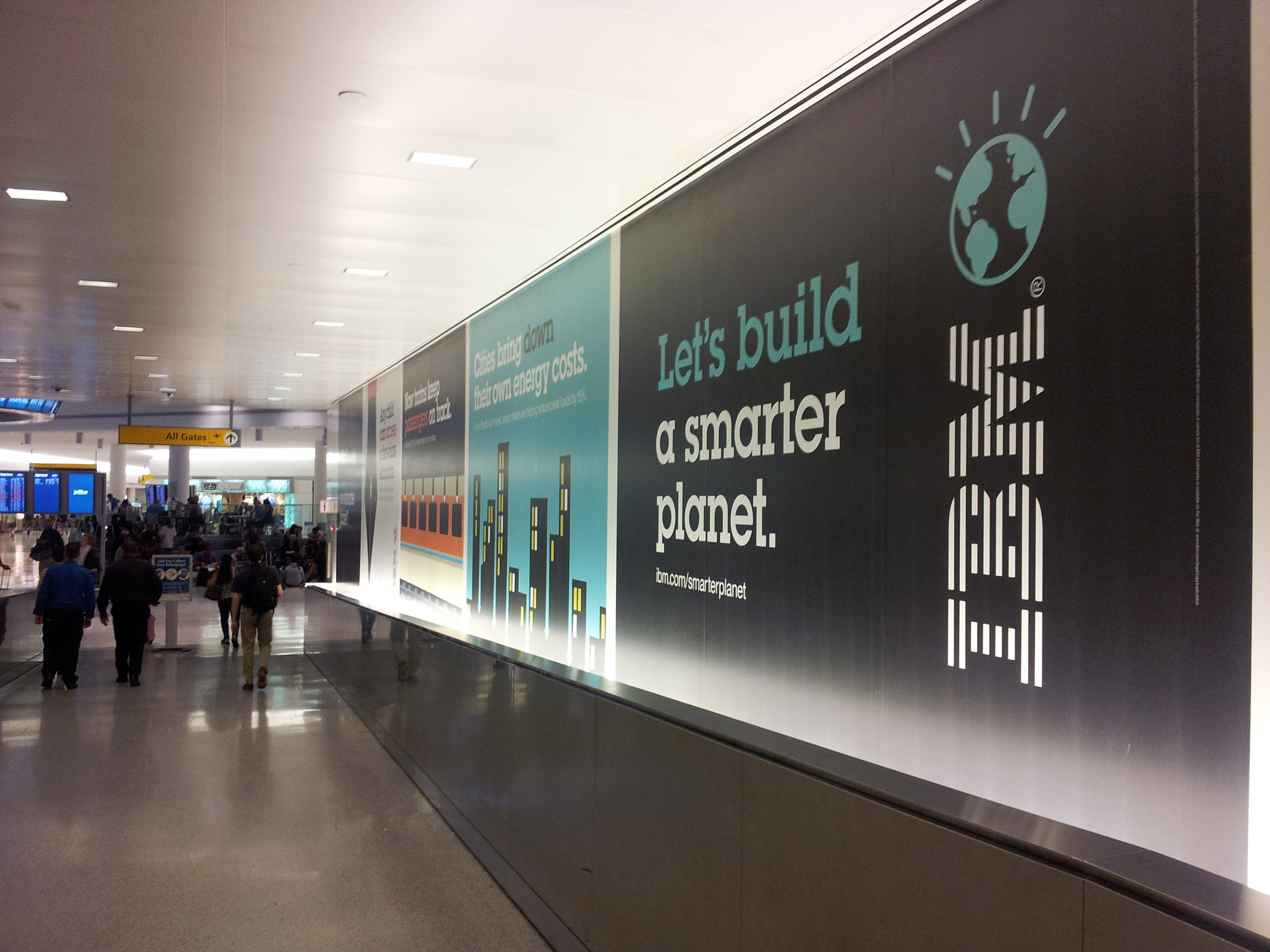
IBM ads at John F. Kennedy International Airport, 2013

IBM is nicknamed Big Blue partly because of its blue logo and color scheme, and also in reference to its former de facto dress code of white shirts with blue suits. The company logo has undergone several changes over the years, with its current "8-bar" logo designed in 1972 by graphic designer Paul Rand. It was a general replacement for a 13-bar logo, since period photocopiers did not render narrow (as opposed to tall) stripes well. Aside from the logo, IBM used Helvetica as a corporate typeface for 50 years, until it was replaced in 2017 by the custom-designed IBM Plex.

Since 1996, IBM has been the exclusive technology partner for the Masters Tournament, one of the four major championships in professional golf. IBM is also a major sponsor in professional tennis, with engagements at the U.S. Open, Wimbledon, the Australian Open, and the French Open. The company sponsored the Olympic Games from 1960 to 2000 and the National Football League from 2003 to 2012. In Japan, IBM employees also have an American football team complete with pro stadium, cheerleaders and televised games, competing in the Japanese X-League as the "Big Blue".

== People and culture ==
=== Employees ===
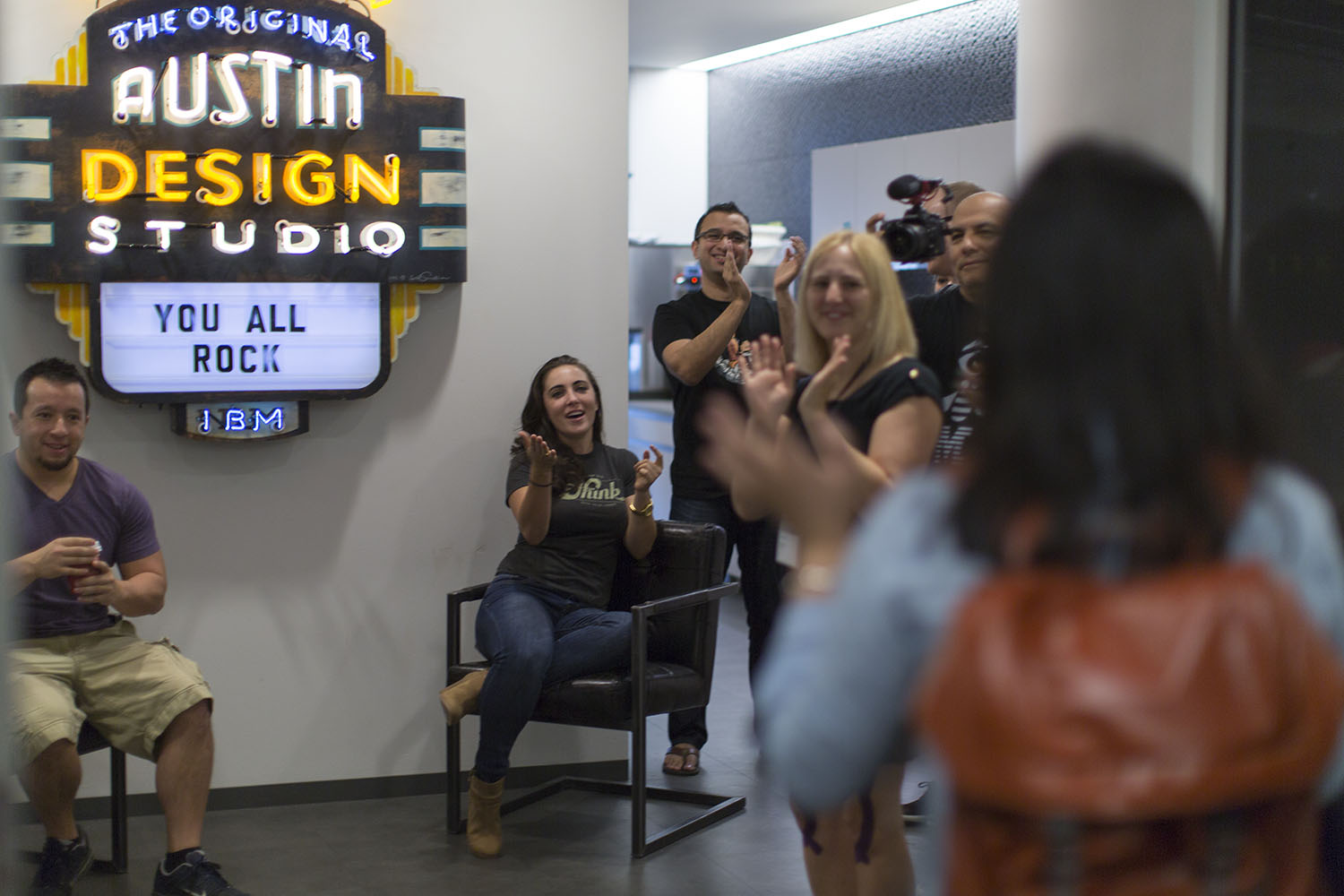
New IBM employees being welcomed to a bootcamp at IBM Austin, 2015

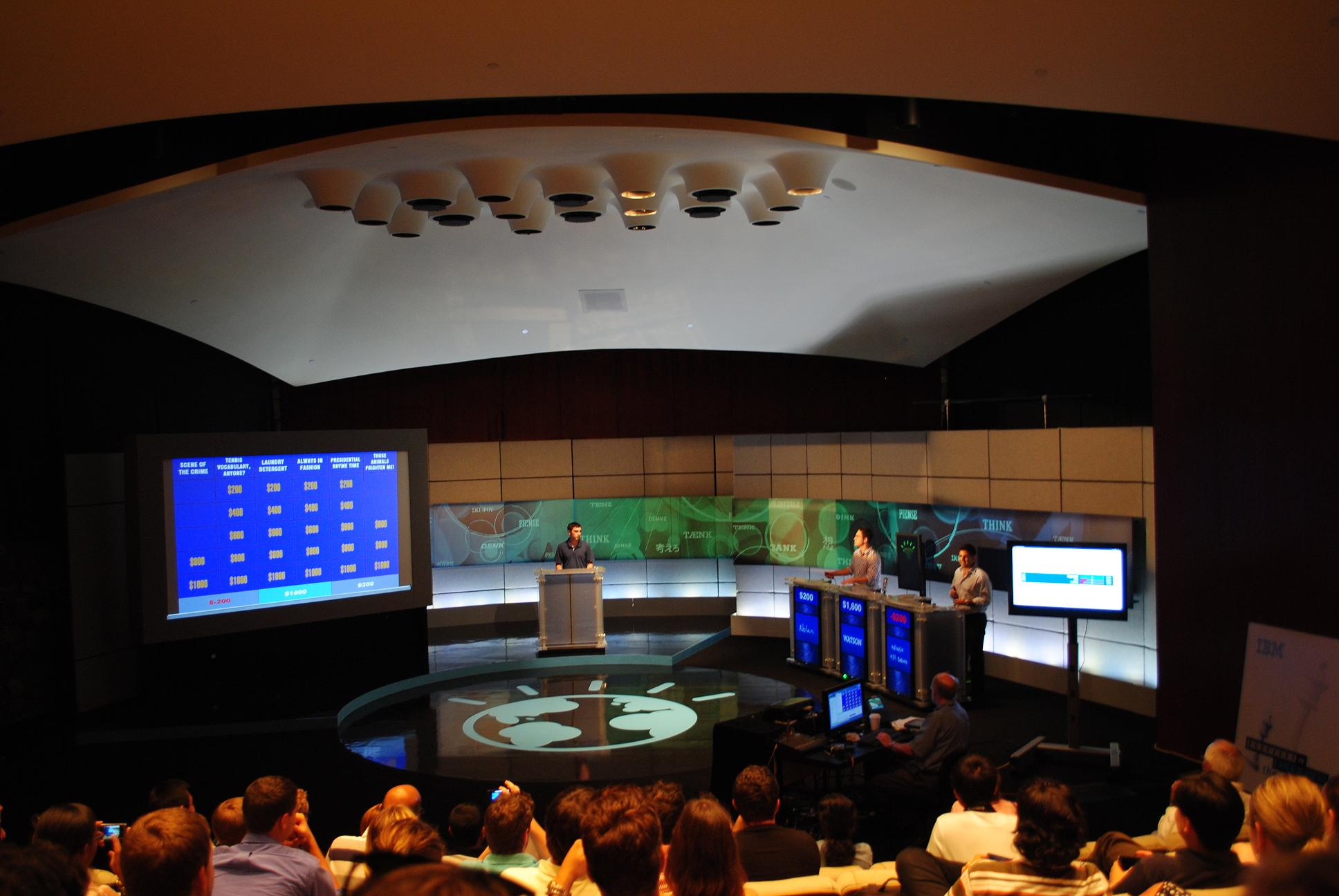
Employees demonstrating IBM Watson capabilities in a Jeopardy! exhibition match on campus, 2011

IBM is among the world's largest employers, with over 297,900 employees worldwide in 2022, with about 160,000 of those being tech consultants.

IBM's leadership programs include Extreme Blue, an internship program, and the IBM Fellow award, offered since 1963 based on technical achievement.

==== Notable current and former employees ====
Many IBM employees have achieved notability outside of work and after leaving IBM. In business, former IBM employees include:

- Tim Cook, Apple executive chairman and former CEO
- Ross Perot, former EDS CEO and presidential candidate
- John W. Thompson, Microsoft chairman
- Hasso Plattner, SAP co-founder
- Gideon Gartner, Gartner founder
- Lisa Su, AMD CEO
- Anirudh Devgan, Cadence Design Systems CEO
- Ellen Alemany, former Citizens Financial Group CEO
- Alfred Amoroso, former Yahoo! chairman
- C. Michael Armstrong, former AT&T CEO
- David T. Kearns and G. Richard Thoman, former Xerox Corporation CEOs
- Mark N. Greene, former Fair Isaac Corporation CEO
- Ed Iacobucci, Citrix Systems co-founder
- Brian McBride, ASOS chairman
- Steve Ward, former Lenovo CEO
- Kenneth Simonds, former Teradata CEO

In government, IBM alumni include:

- Patricia Roberts Harris, former United States Secretary of Housing and Urban Development and the first African American woman to serve in the United States Cabinet.
- Samuel K. Skinner, former U.S. Secretary of Transportation and White House Chief of Staff
- Mack Mattingly, U.S. Senator
- Thom Tillis, U.S. Senator
- Scott Walker, governor of Wisconsin
- Vincent Obsitnik, former U.S. ambassador to Slovakia
- Arthur K. Watson, former U.S. ambassador to France
- Thomas Watson Jr., former U.S. ambassador to the Soviet Union
- Todd Akin, former U.S. Representative
- Glenn Andrews, former U.S. Representative
- Robert Garcia, former U.S. Representative
- Katherine Harris, former U.S. Representative
- Amo Houghton, former U.S. Representative
- Jim Ross Lightfoot, former U.S. Representative
- Thomas J. Manton, former U.S. Representative
- Donald W. Riegle Jr., former U.S. Representative
- Ed Zschau, former U.S. Representative

Other former IBM employees include NASA astronaut Michael J. Massimino, Canadian astronaut and former Governor General Julie Payette, noted musician Dave Matthews, Harvey Mudd College president Maria Klawe, Western Governors University president emeritus Robert Mendenhall, former University of Kentucky president Lee T. Todd Jr., former University of Iowa president Bruce Harreld, NFL referee Bill Carollo, former Rangers F.C. chairman John McClelland, and recipient of the Nobel Prize in Literature J. M. Coetzee. Thomas Watson Jr. also served as the 11th national president of the Boy Scouts of America.

Besides Coetzee, five other IBM employees have received the Nobel Prize: Leo Esaki, of the Thomas J. Watson Research Center in Yorktown Heights, N.Y., in 1973, for work in semiconductors; Gerd Binnig and Heinrich Rohrer, of the Zurich Research Center, in 1986, for the scanning tunneling microscope; and Georg Bednorz and Alex Müller, also of Zurich, in 1987, for research in superconductivity. Six IBM employees have won the Turing Award, including the first female recipient Frances E. Allen. Ten National Medals of Technology and five National Medals of Science have been awarded to IBM employees.

=== Workplace culture ===
Employees are often referred to as "IBMers". IBM's culture has evolved significantly over its century of operations. In its early days, a dark (or gray) suit, white shirt, and a "sincere" tie constituted the public uniform for IBM employees. During IBM's management transformation in the 1990s, CEO Louis V. Gerstner Jr. relaxed these codes, normalizing the dress and behavior of IBM employees. The company's culture has also given to different plays on the company acronym (IBM), with some saying it stands for "I've Been Moved," based on frequent relocations, others saying it stands for "I'm By Myself" pursuant to a prevalent work-from-anywhere norm, and others saying it stands for "I'm Being Mentored" in reference to the company's open door policy and encouragement for mentoring at all levels. Similar IBM backronyms exist within the industry, such as Computerworld producing a badge labelled "It's Better Manually" implying it would be easier to use a paper-based system than a computer. The company has traditionally resisted labor union organizing, although unions represent some IBM workers outside the United States.

== Leadership ==
=== President ===
1. Thomas J. Watson, 1911–1949
2. John George Phillips, 1949–1951
3. Thomas J. Watson Jr., 1951–1961
4. Albert Lynn Williams, 1961–1966
5. T. Vincent Learson, 1966–1971
6. Frank T. Cary, 1971–1974
7. John R. Opel, 1974–1983
8. John Fellows Akers, 1983–1989
9. Jack Kuehler, 1989–2000
10. Samuel J. Palmisano, 2000–2012
11. Ginni Rometty, 2012–2020
12. Arvind Krishna, 2020–present

=== Chairman of the Board ===
1. George Winthrop Fairchild, 1915–1949
2. Thomas J. Watson, 1949–1961
3. Thomas J. Watson Jr., 1961–1971
4. T. Vincent Learson, 1971–1972
5. Frank T. Cary, 1972–1983
6. John R. Opel, 1983–1986
7. John Fellows Akers, 1986–1993
8. Lou Gerstner, 1993–2002
9. Samuel J. Palmisano, 2003–2012
10. Ginni Rometty, 2012–2020
11. Arvind Krishna, 2020–present

== See also ==
- List of electronics brands
- List of largest Internet companies
- List of largest manufacturing companies by revenue
- Tech companies in the New York City metropolitan region
- Top 100 US Federal Contractors
- Quantum Energy Teleportation using IBM superconducting computers
