= IBM Research =

Multinational research organization

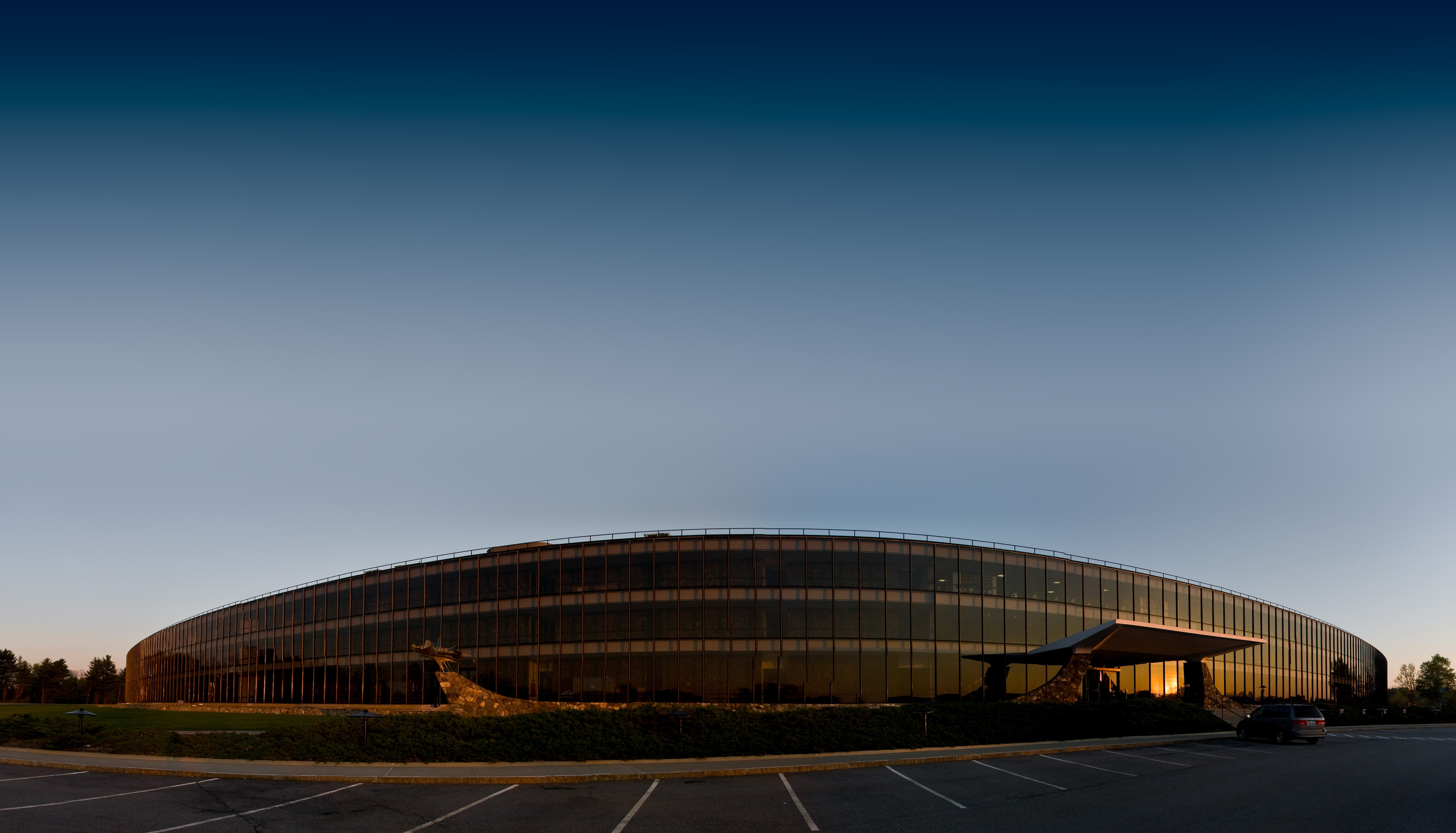
- The Eero Saarinen-designed Thomas J. Watson Research Center, headquarters of the division
- Type: Research and development division
- Industry: Computer science
- Predecessor: Watson Scientific Computing Laboratory
- Founded: 1945; 81 years ago
- Headquarters: Yorktown Heights, New York, United States
- Number of locations: 170 countries; 12 laboratories; six continents (2021)
- Parent: IBM
- Website: research.ibm.com

IBM Research is the research and development division for IBM, an American multinational information technology company. IBM Research is headquartered at the Thomas J. Watson Research Center in Yorktown Heights, New York, near IBM headquarters in Armonk, New York. It has operations in over 170 countries and twelve laboratories on six continents.

IBM employees have garnered six Nobel Prizes, seven Turing Awards, 20 inductees into the U.S. National Inventors Hall of Fame, 19 National Medals of Technology, five National Medals of Science and three Kavli Prizes. As of 2018, the company had generated more patents than any other business in each of 25 consecutive years.

== History ==
The roots of today's IBM Research began with the 1945 opening of the Watson Scientific Computing Laboratory at Columbia University, that was the first IBM laboratory devoted to pure science. It later expanded into additional IBM Research locations in Westchester County, New York, starting in the 1950s, including the Thomas J. Watson Research Center in 1961.

Notable company inventions include the floppy disk, the hard disk drive, the magnetic stripe card, the relational database, the Universal Product Code (UPC), the financial swap, the Fortran programming language, SABRE airline reservation system, DRAM, copper wiring in semiconductors, the smartphone, the portable computer, the ATM, the silicon-on-insulator (SOI) semiconductor manufacturing process, Watson artificial intelligence and the Quantum Experience.

Advances in nanotechnology include IBM in atoms, where a scanning tunneling microscope was used to arrange 35 individual xenon atoms on a substrate of chilled crystal of nickel to spell out the three letter company acronym. It was the first time atoms had been precisely positioned on a flat surface.

Major undertakings at IBM Research have included the invention of innovative materials and structures, high-performance microprocessors and computers, analytical methods and tools, algorithms, software architectures, methods for managing, searching and deriving meaning from data and in turning IBM's advanced services methodologies into reusable assets.

IBM Research's numerous contributions to physical and computer sciences include the Scanning Tunneling Microscope and high-temperature superconductivity, both of which were awarded the Nobel Prize. IBM Research was behind the inventions of the SABRE travel reservation system, the technology of laser eye surgery, magnetic storage, the relational database, UPC barcodes and Watson, the question-answering computing system that won a match against human champions on the Jeopardy! television quiz show. The Watson technology is now being commercialized as part of a project with healthcare company Anthem Inc. Other notable developments include the Data Encryption Standard (DES), fast Fourier transform (FFT), Benoît Mandelbrot's introduction of fractals, magnetic disk storage (hard disks), the MELD-Plus risk score, the one-transistor dynamic random-access memory (DRAM), the reduced instruction set computer (RISC) architecture, relational databases, and Deep Blue (grandmaster-level chess-playing computer).

== Notable IBM researchers ==
There are a number of computer scientists "who made IBM Research famous." These include Frances E. Allen, Marc Auslander, John Backus, Charles H. Bennett, Erich Bloch, Grady Booch, Fred Brooks (known for his book The Mythical Man-Month), Peter Brown, Larry Carter, Gregory Chaitin, John Cocke, Alan Cobham, Edgar F. Codd, Don Coppersmith, Wallace Eckert, Ronald Fagin, Horst Feistel, Jeanne Ferrante, Zvi Galil, Ralph E. Gomory, Jim Gray, Joseph Halpern, Kenneth E. Iverson, Frederick Jelinek, Reynold B. Johnson, Benoit Mandelbrot, Robert Mercer, C. Mohan, Kirsten Moselund, Michael O. Rabin, Arthur Samuel, Barbara Simons, Alfred Spector, Gardiner Tucker, Moshe Vardi, John Vlissides, Mark N. Wegman and Shmuel Winograd.

== Laboratories ==
As of 2021, IBM had 19 research facilities spread across twelve laboratories on six continents including in Nairobi, Kenya, and Johannesburg, South Africa in Africa; in Cambridge, Massachusetts, San Jose, California, and at the IBM Thomas J. Watson Research Center, in Yorktown Heights and Albany, New York, US, in North America; in Haifa, Israel, in the Middle East; in Dublin, Ireland, Zürich, Switzerland, and Daresbury and Hursley, United Kingdom, in Europe; and in Delhi and Bengaluru, India, in Tokyo, Kyoto and Shin-Kawasaki, Japan, in Asia.

Historic research centers for IBM also include IBM La Gaude (Nice), the Cambridge Scientific Center, the IBM New York Scientific Center, 330 North Wabash (Chicago), IBM Austin Research Laboratory, and IBM Laboratory Vienna.

In 2017, IBM invested $240 million to create the MIT–IBM Watson AI Lab. Headquartered in Cambridge, MA, the Lab is a joint research venture in artificial intelligence established by IBM and MIT. The Lab funds approximately 50 projects per year. Projects include computer vision, natural language processing and reinforcement learning.

=== Silicon Valley ===
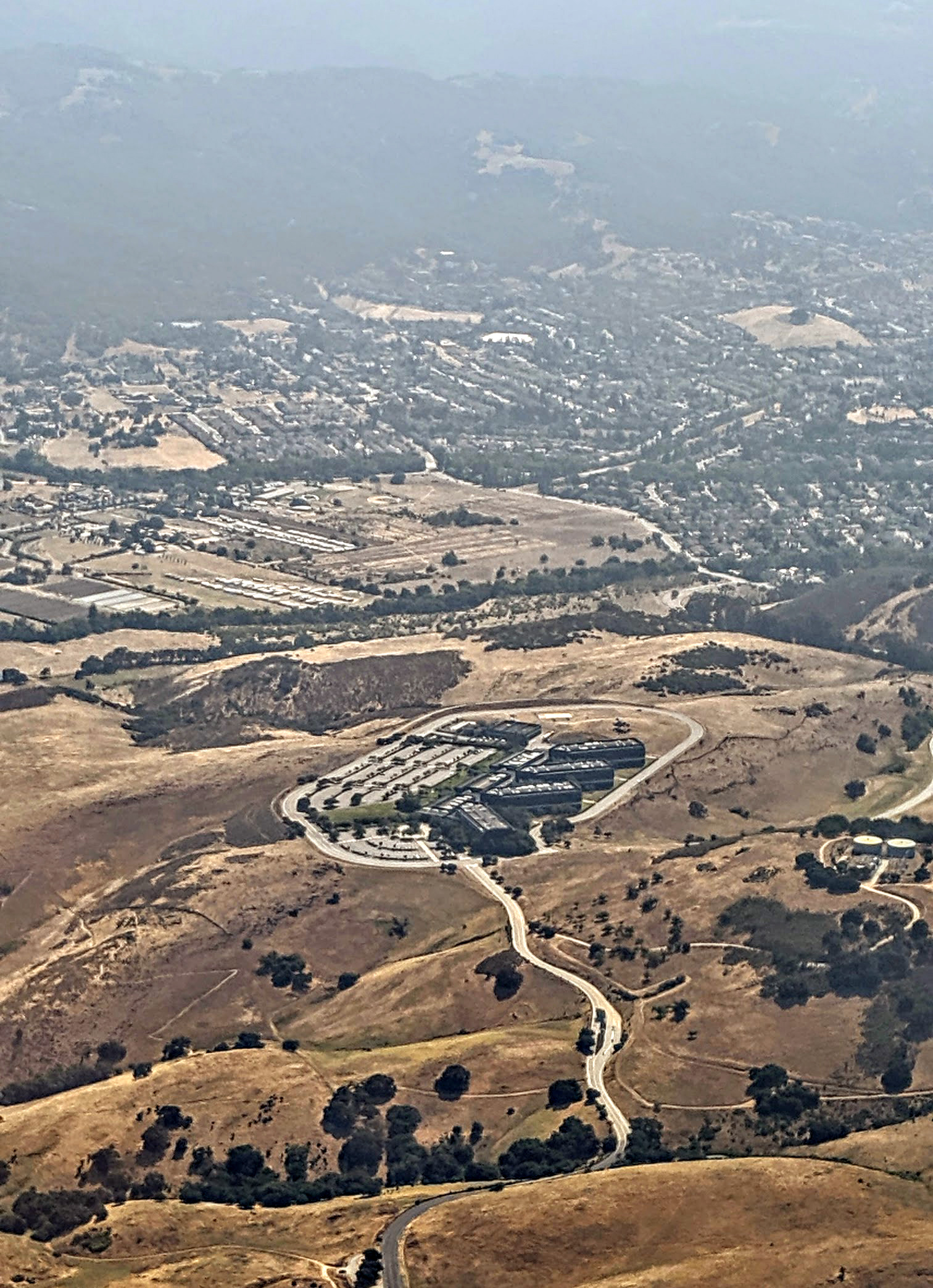
IBM Research – Almaden

In 2025, IBM Research moved its Almaden-based lab from the Almaden Valley, San Jose, California to the new IBM Research-Silicon Valley Lab in San Jose, California. Its scientists continue to perform basic and applied research in computer science, services, storage systems, physical sciences, and materials science and technology.

The former IBM Research – Almaden location occupied part of a site owned by IBM at 650 Harry Road on nearly 700 acres (2.8 km^{2}) of land in the Santa Teresa Hills above Silicon Valley. The site, built in 1985 for the research center, was chosen because of its close proximity to Stanford University, UC Santa Cruz, UC Berkeley and other collaborative academic institutions. Today, the research division is still the largest tenant of the site, but the majority of occupants work for other divisions of IBM.

IBM opened its first West Coast research center, the San Jose Research Laboratory in 1952, managed by Reynold B. Johnson. Among its first developments was the IBM 350, the first commercial moving head hard disk drive. Launched in 1956, this saw use in the IBM 305 RAMAC computer system. Subdivisions included the Advanced Systems Development Division. Directors of the center include hard disc drive developer Jack Harker.

Scientists at IBM Research – Almaden, now IBM Research-Silicon Valley have contributed to several scientific discoveries such as the development of photoresists and the quantum mirage effect.

The following are some of the notable scientists who have worked in the past or are currently working in this laboratory: Rakesh Agrawal, Miklos Ajtai, Rama Akkiraju, John Backus, Raymond F. Boyce, Donald D. Chamberlin, Ashok K. Chandra, Edgar F. Codd, Mark Dean, Cynthia Dwork, Don Eigler, Ronald Fagin, Jim Gray, Laura M. Haas, Jean Paul Jacob, Joseph Halpern, Andreas J. Heinrich, Reynold B. Johnson, Maria Klawe, Jaishankar Menon, Dharmendra Modha, William E. Moerner, C. Mohan, Stuart Parkin, Nick Pippenger, Dan Russell, Patricia Selinger, Ted Selker, Barbara Simons, Malcolm Slaney, Arnold Spielberg, Ramakrishnan Srikant, Larry Stockmeyer, Moshe Vardi, Jennifer Widom, Shumin Zhai.

=== Australia ===
IBM Research – Australia was a research and development laboratory established by IBM Research in 2009 in Melbourne. It was involved in social media, interactive content, healthcare analytics and services research, multimedia analytics, and genomics. The inaugural lab director was IBM Distinguished Engineer Glenn Wightwick and the lab was subsequently headed by several directors over its 10 years lifespan, including Vice President, Joanna Batstone and Professor Iven Mareels. It was to be the company's first laboratory combining research and development in a single organization.

The opening of the Melbourne lab in 2011 received an injection of $22 million in Australian Federal Government funding and an undisclosed amount provided by the state government. The Melbourne Research lab was closed in 2021, approximately at the same time as the deal for tax breaks from the state government ended. Approximately 80 full-time researchers were made redundant.

=== Brazil ===
IBM Research – Brazil, established in 2011, was the first IBM Research laboratory in South America, with locations in São Paulo and Rio de Janeiro. Research focuses include industrial technology and science, systems of engagement and insight, social data analytics and natural resources solutions.

The new lab was IBM's ninth at the time of opening and the first in twelve years. According to The Wall Street Journal, its establishment underscored the growing importance of emerging markets and the globalization of innovation. In collaboration with Brazil's government, it was reported at the time to help IBM to develop technology systems around natural resource development and large-scale events such as the 2016 Summer Olympics.

Engineer and associate lab director Ulisses Mello stated, in 2014, that IBM had four priority areas in Brazil:

"The main area is related to natural resources management, involving oil and gas, mining and agricultural sectors. The second is the social data analytics segment that comprises the analysis of data generated from social networking sites [such as Twitter or Facebook], which can be applied, for example, to financial analysis. The third strategic area is nanotechnology applied to the development of the smarter devices for the intermittent production industry. This technology can be applied to, for example, blood testing or recovering oil from existing fields. And the last one is smarter cities."

The lab was closed on December 18, 2025, with IBM mentioning the work done by the lab would be consolidated with the work performed by other labs in different regions.

=== Japan ===
The IBM Research – Tokyo, which was called IBM Tokyo Research Laboratory (TRL) before January 2009, is one of IBM's twelve major worldwide research laboratories. It is a branch of IBM Research, and about 200 researchers work for TRL. Established in 1982 as the Japan Science Institute (JSI) in Tokyo, it was renamed to IBM Tokyo Research Laboratory in 1986, and moved to Yamato in 1992 and back to Tokyo in 2012.

IBM Tokyo Research Laboratory was established in 1982 as the Japan Science Institute (JSI) in Sanbanchō, Tokyo. It was IBM's first research laboratory in Asia. Hisashi Kobayashi was appointed the founding director of TRL in 1982; he served as director until 1986. JSI was renamed to the IBM Tokyo Research Laboratory in 1986. In 1988, English-to-Japanese machine translation system called "System for Human-Assisted Language Translation" (SHALT) was developed at TRL. It was used to translate IBM manuals.

==== History ====
TRL was shifted from downtown Tokyo to the suburbs to share a building with IBM Yamato Facility in Yamato, Kanagawa Prefecture in 1993. In 1993, world record was accomplished for generation of continuous coherent Ultraviolet rays. In 1996, Java JIT compiler was developed at TRL, and it was released for major IBM platforms. Numerous other technological breakthroughs were made at TRL.

The team led by Chieko Asakawa (ja:浅川智恵子), IBM Fellow since 2009, provided basic technology for IBM's software programs for the visually handicapped, IBM Home Page Reader in 1997 and IBM aiBrowser (ja:aiBrowser) in 2007. TRL moved back to Tokyo in 2012, this time at IBM Toyosu Facility.

==== Research ====
TRL researchers are responsible for numerous breakthroughs in sciences and engineering. The researchers have presented multiple papers at international conferences, and published numerous papers in international journals. They have also contributed to the products and services of IBM, and patent filings. TRL conducts research in microdevices, system software, security and privacy, analytics and optimization, human computer interaction, embedded systems, and services sciences.

==== Other activities ====
TRL collaborates with the Japanese universities, and support their research programs. IBM donates its equipment such as servers, storage systems, and so forth to the Japanese universities to support their research programs under the Shared University Research (SUR) program.

In 1987, IBM Japan Science Prize was created to recognize researchers, who are not over 45 years old, working at Japanese universities or public research institutes. It is awarded in physics, chemistry, computer science, and electronics.

=== Israel ===
IBM Research – Haifa, previously known as the Haifa Research Lab (HRL) was founded as a small scientific center in 1972. Since then, it has grown into a major lab that leads the development of innovative technologies and solutions for the IBM corporation. The lab’s offices are situated in three locations across Israel: Haifa, Tel Aviv, and Beer Sheva.

IBM Research – Haifa employs researchers in a range of areas. Research projects are being executed today in areas such as artificial intelligence, hybrid cloud, quantum computing, blockchain, IoT, quality, cybersecurity, and industry domains such as healthcare.

Aya Soffer is IBM vice president of AI technology and serves as the director of the IBM Research Lab in Haifa, Israel.

==== History ====
In its 30th year, the IBM Haifa Research Lab in Israel moved to a new home on the University of Haifa campus.

The researchers at the Lab are involved in special projects with academic institutions across Israel, the United States, and Europe, and actively participate in numerous consortiums as part of the EU Horizon 2020 programme. Today in 2020, the Lab describes itself as having the highest number of employees in Israel's hi-tech industry who hold advanced degrees in science, electrical engineering, mathematics, or related fields. Researchers participate in international conferences and are published in professional publications.

In 2014, IBM Research announced the Cybersecurity Center of Excellence (CCoE) in Beer Sheva in collaboration with Ben-Gurion University of the Negev.

=== Switzerland ===
IBM Research – Zurich (previously called IBM Zurich Research Laboratory, ZRL) is the European branch of IBM Research. It was opened in 1956 and is located in Rüschlikon near Zürich, Switzerland.

In 1956, IBM opened their first European research laboratory in Adliswil, Switzerland. The lab moved to its own campus in neighboring Rüschlikon in 1962. The Zürich lab is staffed by a multicultural and interdisciplinary team of a few hundred permanent research staff members, graduate students and postdoctoral fellows, representing about 45 nationalities. Collocated with the lab is a Client Center (formerly the Industry Solutions Lab), an executive briefing facility demonstrating technology prototypes and solutions.

The Zürich lab is world-renowned for its scientific achievements—most notably Nobel Prizes in physics in 1986 and 1987 for the invention of the scanning tunneling microscope and the discovery of high-temperature superconductivity, respectively. Other key inventions include trellis modulation, which revolutionized data transmission over telephone lines; Token Ring, which became a standard for local area networks and a highly successful IBM product; the Secure Electronic Transaction (SET) standard used for highly secure payments; and the Java Card OpenPlatform (JCOP), a smart card operating system. The lab contributed significantly to the development and standartization of ML-KEM, and ML-DSA, two important standards in post-quantum cryptography. Most recently the lab was involved in the development of SuperMUC, a supercomputer that is cooled using hot water.

The Zürich lab focus areas are future chip technologies; nanotechnology; data storage; quantum computing, brain-inspired computing; security and privacy; risk and compliance; business optimization and transformation; server systems. The Zürich laboratory is involved in many joint projects with universities throughout Europe, in research programs established by the European Union and the Swiss government, and in cooperation agreements with research institutes of industrial partners. One of the lab's most high-profile projects is DOME Microserver, which is based on developing an IT roadmap for the Square Kilometer Array.

The research projects pursued at the IBM Zürich lab are organized into four scientific and technical departments: Science & Technology, Cloud and AI Systems Research, Cognitive Computing & Industry Solutions and Security Research. The lab is currently managed by Alessandro Curioni.

On April 15, 2010, three environmental activists were arrested at a traffic checkpoint near the Zürich lab, accused of planning a bomb attack on an IBM nanotechnology center in construction. In 2011 they were found guilty of conspiring to destroy the center, importing, hiding, and transporting explosives, and were sentenced to prison with sentences ranging from three years to three years and eight months.

On May 17, 2011, IBM and the Swiss Federal Institute of Technology (ETH) Zurich opened the Binnig and Rohrer Nanotechnology Center, which is located on the same campus in Rüschlikon.

== IBM Scientific Centers ==
In addition to the IBM Research Division, the IBM Scientific Centers, which were active in various functions from 1964 to the early 1990s, were another remarkable research unit. In contrast to the central control of the Research Division from the headquarters in Armonk in the US, the IBM Scientific Centers were structured in a decentralized manner. Each center functioned as an integral part of the IBM organization in its respective region or country. This organization also financed the center and ultimately determined its content and strategic direction. The task of an IBM Scientific Center was to contribute with its research, its expertise and its cooperation projects for the benefit of the respective country and thus to contribute to the reputation of IBM in this country or this region.

While the research laboratories of the IBM Research Division had to be very restrictive with regard to scientific cooperation projects with non-IBM institutions for patent reasons and other reasons, technical-scientific and application-oriented cooperation projects with universities and other public research institutions were an important part of IBM's mission for the scientific centers. Because of this, the spectrum of activities of such a center was often very broad. For example, some research groups could deal with topics that can be assigned to basic or product-oriented research, while others dealt with application-oriented research topics, for example satellite-based soil classification.

Descriptions of the thematic focus and research projects as well as a selection of references to the scientific publications of the individual centers, as far as they were still alive in 1989, can be found in. A comprehensive description of the evolution, projects, and success stories of the IBM Heidelberg Scientific Center from its very beginning and to shortly before its end can be found in.

The history of the IBM Scientific Centers began in 1964 with the founding of the first four centers in the US (marked with * in the list below) and has subsequently grown to 26 centers worldwide in 1989. Their story ended in the early 1990s.

- Bari, Italy (1969–1979)
- Bergen, Norway (since 1986)
- Brasilia, Brazil (1980–1986)
- Cairo, Egypt (since 1983)
- Cambridge, Massachusetts, US (since 1964) *
- Caracas, Venezuela (since 1983)
- Grenoble, France (1967–1973)
- Haifa, Israel (since 1972)
- Heidelberg, Germany (since 1968)
- Houston, Texas (1966–1974)
- Kuwait City, Kuwait (since 1980)
- Los Angeles, California, US (since 1964) *
- Madrid, Spain (since 1972)
- Mexico City, Mexico (since 1971)
- New York City (1964–1972) *
- Palo Alto, California, US (since 1964) *
- Paris, France (since 1977)
- Peterlee, United Kingdom (1969–1979)
- Pisa, Italy (since 1971)
- Philadelphia, Pennsylvania, US (1972–1974)
- Rio de Janeiro, Brazil (since 1986)
- Rome, Italy (since 1979)
- Tokyo, Japan (since 1970)
- Venice, Italy (1969–1979)
- Wheaton, Maryland, US (1967–1969)
- Winchester, United Kingdom (since 1979)

== Publications ==
- IBM Journal of Research and Development
