= Soffer =

Soffer (Hebrew: סופר) is a surname. Notable people with the name include:

- Adi Soffer (born 1987), Israeli footballer
- Ariel David Soffer (born 1965), American cardiologist
- Arnon Soffer (born 1935), Israeli geographer and professor
- Avi Soffer (born 1986), Israeli soccer player
- Aya Soffer, Israeli computer scientist
- Bernard H Soffer, co-inventor of solid-state dye lasers
- Donald Soffer (1933–2025), American real estate developer
- Jesse Lee Soffer (born 1984), American actor
- Joseph Soffer (1913–2006), American real estate developer
- Oren Soffer (born 1988), Israeli-American cinematographer
- Oren Soffer (professor), Israeli professor of communications studies
- Ram Soffer (born 1965), Israeli chess grandmaster
- Sasson Soffer (1925–2009), American abstract painter and sculptor
