= Vuković =

Vuković (Serbian: Вуковић, pronounced [ʋûːkoʋitɕ]) is a common family name found in Bosnia and Herzegovina, Croatia, Montenegro, and Serbia, of which bearers are either Bosniaks, Croats, Montenegrins or Serbs, as well as medieval families long before idea of national identity ever appeared.

The surname is derived from the Serbo-Croatian word for wolf, vuk, which is also used as a given name, Vuk.

It is the ninth most frequent surname in Croatia.

== People ==
- Aleksandar Vuković (born 1979), Serbian-Polish football manager
- Andrija Vuković (born 1983), Croatian footballer
- Božidar Vuković (1466-–1540), Venetian-Serb printer
- Čedo Vuković (1920–2014), Montenegrin writer
- Daniel Vukovic (born 1986), Canadian-Swiss ice hockey player
- Danny Vukovic (born 1985), Australian footballer, of Serbian descent
- David Vuković (born 2003), Bosnian footballer
- Dejan Vuković (born 1978), Serbian politician
- Domagoj Vuković (born 1993), Croatian basketball player
- Dragan Vuković (born 1963), Serbian basketball coach
- Drago Vuković (born 1983), Croatian handball player
- Dražen Vuković (born 1981), Croatian footballer
- Gavro Vuković (1852–1928), Montenegrin Serb duke and writer
- Goran Vuković Majmun (1959–1994), Serbian mobster
- Helena Vuković (born 2000), Croatian judoka
- Hrvoje Vuković (born 1979), Croatian football player
- Ivan Vuković (footballer) (born 1987), Montenegrin footballer
- Jagoš Vuković (born 1988), Serbian footballer
- Janko Vuković (1871–1918), Croatian sailor in the Austro-Hungarian navy
- Jelena Vuković (born 1975), Croatian paralympic athlete
- Josip Vuković (born 1992), Croatian footballer
- Katarina Vuković, Bosnian noblewoman
- Katja Vuković (born 2006), Croatian handball player
- Lazar Vuković (died 1410), Serbian prince
- Maja Vuković, computer scientist
- Marija Vuković (footballer) (born 1990), Serbian footballer
- Marija Vuković (born 1992), Montenegrin athlete
- Matija Vuković (1925–1985), Serbian sculptor
- Mihajlo Vuković (1944–2021), Serbian basketball player and coach
- Milan Vuković (1933–2018), Croatian jurist and judge
- Milan Vuković (born 1988), Serbian footballer
- Milena Vuković (born 1986), Serbian footballer
- Miljan Vuković (born 1990), Serbian rower
- Nemanja Vuković (born 1984), Montenegrin footballer
- Predrag Vuković (born 1966), Serbian politician
- Sava Vuković (1912–1961), Serbian chess master
- Sava Vuković (1930–2001), Serbian orthodox bishop
- Sebő Vukovics (1811–1872), Hungarian Minister of Justice 1849, of Serbian descent
- Slobodan Vuković (born 1986), Serbian footballer
- Stefan Vukovic (born 1993), Canadian soccer player and coach
- Vanja Vukovic (born 1971), German fine-art photographer and photo-designer of Montenegrin descent
- Veselin Vuković (born 1958), Yugoslav handball player
- Vićenco Vuković (fl. 1560–71), printer and editor of books in Serbian in the Republic of Venice
- Violeta Vuković (born 1972), Serbian basketball player
- Vlatko Vuković (died 1392), Grand Duke of Hum (modern Herzegovina)
- Vladimir Vuković (1898–1975), Croatian chess player, writer, theoretician
- Želimir Vuković (born 1983), Serbian alpine skier
- Željko Vuković (footballer, born 1962), Croatian-born Austrian footballer
- Željko Vuković (footballer, born 1963), Montenegrin footballer
- Zoran Vuković (born 1955), Bosnian Serb soldier charged with crimes in the Bosnian War

== See also ==
- Vukovich, a transliteration
