= Galambos =

Galambos is a Hungarian surname. Meaning a keeper of doves, from galamb ‘dove’, ‘pigeon’

Notable people with the surname include:

- Eva Galambos (1928–2015), the first mayor of Sandy Springs, Georgia
- George M. Galambos, Hungarian-born computer engineer
- Imre Galambos (born 1967), Hungarian sinologist and tangutologist
- Janos Galambos (1940–2019), Hungarian mathematician
- Robert Galambos (1914–2010), American neuroscientist
- Tamas Galambos (born 1939), Hungarian contemporary artist
