= Arimilli =

Arimilli (Telugu: ఆరిమిల్లి) is a Telugu surname. Notable people with the surname include:

- Arimilli Radha Krishna (born 1973), Indian politician
- Ravi Arimilli (born 1963), American computer specialist
