= Aleksandra Mojsilovic =

Serbian-American scientist (born 1968)

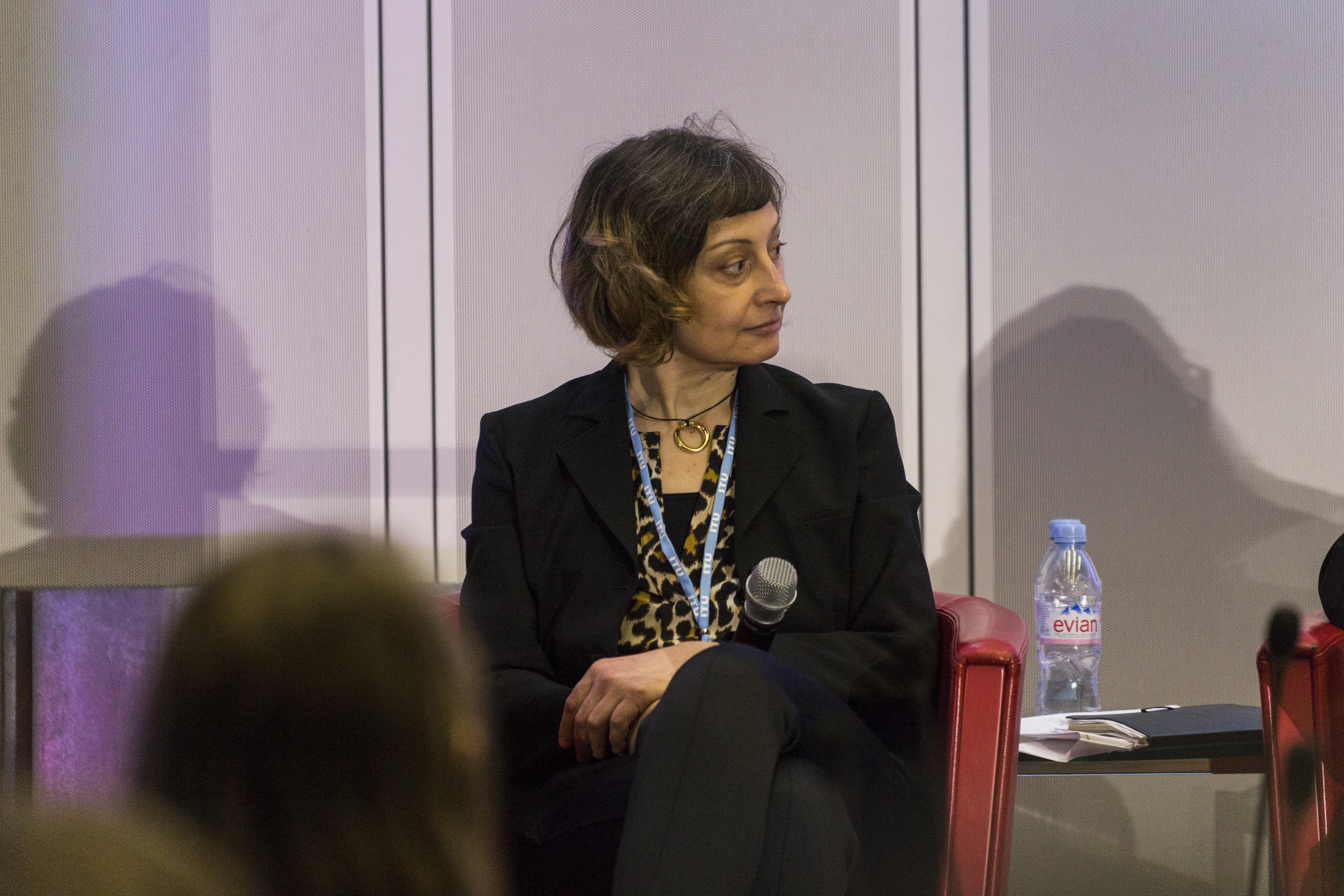
- Mojsilovic in 2018
- Born: Belgrade, Serbia
- Education: University of Belgrade
- Employer: IBM Research
- Known for: Multidimensional signal processing, computer vision, AI for social good, AI ethics

Aleksandra (Saška) Mojsilović (born 1968) is a Serbian-American scientist. Her research interests are artificial intelligence, data science, and signal processing. She is known for innovative applications of machine learning to diverse societal and business problems. Her current research focuses on issues of fairness, accountability, transparency, and ethics in AI. She is an IBM Fellow and IEEE Fellow.

== Education and career ==
Mojsilović was born in Belgrade, Serbia. She received her PhD in Electrical Engineering in 1997 from the University of Belgrade, Belgrade, Serbia. From 1997 to 1998, she was an assistant professor at the University of Belgrade. From 1998 to 2000, she was a Member of Technical Staff at the Bell Laboratories, Murray Hill, New Jersey. She was at IBM Research from 2000 to 2023. She is currently employed at Google as their senior director, Responsible AI. Prior to joining Google, she led Trustworthy AI at IBM Research and served as a co-director of IBM Science for Social Good.

== Research ==
Mojsilović's research interests include artificial intelligence, machine learning, multi-dimensional signal processing, and data science. She has applied her expertise to diverse application areas, including computer vision, multimedia, recommender systems, medical diagnostics, healthcare, IT operations, business analytics, workforce analytics, drug discovery, disease ecology, and most recently, COVID-19 response. A substantial part of her research is focused on development of ethical, responsible, and beneficial AI systems. In 2015, with Kush Varshney, she created IBM Science for Social Good initiative as a way to promote and direct AI research and development towards applications that benefit humanity. She was among the first researchers to call for transparent reporting on the development and deployment of AI models and systems.

While at IBM Research she helped create leading open source and product capabilities in support of fair, explainable, robust, transparent, and responsible AI. Most notable contributions include: AI Fairness 360, a toolkit for mitigating bias in machine learning models, AI Explainability 360, a toolkit for supporting explanations in AI models, and AI FactSheets 360, an open research effort to foster trust in AI by increasing transparency and enabling governance.

== Awards and recognition ==
- IEEE Young Author Best Paper Award (2001)
- European Conference on Computer Vision Best Paper Award (2002)
- Daniel H. Wagner Prize for Excellence in the Practice of Advanced Analytics and Operations Research (2010)
- IBM Fellow (2014)
- IEEE Fellow (2017)
- Computing Community Consortium and Schmidt Futures AI for Good Award (2019)
- Belfer Center's Technology and Public Purpose Project Spotlights Outstanding Technologies for Public Good (2020)
- 100 Brilliant Women in AI Ethics (2020)
- Tech Spotlight (2021)

== Personal ==
Mojsilović is the creator of the award-winning food blog Three Little Halves, which blends her love of food, photography, and writing. She was nominated for the James Beard Award and received the International Association of Culinary Professionals Award.

Mojsilović serves on the Board of Directors of Neighborhood Trust Financial Partners, which provides financial literacy and economic empowerment training to low-income individuals.

She lives in New York City with her husband and daughter.
