= Eleftheriou =

Eleftheriou may refer to:

- Andrew Eleftheriou (born 1997), English footballer
- Andri Eleftheriou (born 1984), Cypriot sport shooter
- Eleftheria Eleftheriou (born 1989), Greek-Cypriot singer, musician, and actress
- Eleftherios Eleftheriou (born 1974), Cypriot footballer
- Evangelos S. Eleftheriou, Greek electrical engineer
- Georgios Eleftheriou (born 1984), Cypriot footballer
- Eleftheriou Venizelou Street, street in Patras, Greece
