= Tyberg =

Tyberg is a surname. Notable people with the surname include:

- Christy Tyberg, American electronics engineer
- Judith Tyberg (1902–1980), American yogi
- Marcel Tyberg (1893–1944), Austrian composer
