= Jerry Cuomo =

American software engineer

Gennaro "Jerry" Cuomo
- Born: 1962 (age 63–64); Bronx, NY
- Known for: Hyperledger, Blockchain for Business, IBM WebSphere, Co-inventor of "Someone is typing..."
- Scientific career
- Fields: Software engineer
- Workplaces: IBM

Gennaro "Jerry" Anthony Cuomo (born 1962) is an American software engineer who has worked for IBM since 1987. Holding the title of IBM Fellow, Cuomo is known as one of the founding fathers of IBM WebSphere Software, a software framework and middleware that hosts Java-based web applications.

Cuomo has filed for over 50 US patents and has been cited over 3000 times. His most visible patent is the first use of the "Someone is typing..." indicator found in instant messaging applications (U.S. Patent 5,990,887).

At IBM, Cuomo has led projects in the areas of: Blockchain, APIs, cloud computing, mobile computing, Internet of Things, web server performance & availability, web security, web caching, edge computing, service-oriented architecture and REST.

Cuomo is the co-author of the book, Blockchain for Business, that illustrates how blockchain technology is re-imagining many of the world's most fundamental business interactions and opening the door to new styles of digital interactions that have yet to be imagined. In March 2016 and 2018, Cuomo was called upon by the United States government as an expert witness to testify to US Energy and Commerce Committee on Digital Currency and Blockchain. During his 2016 testimony Cuomo urged the Obama administration to adopt Blockchain as a primary means to protect citizen identity and to enhance national security. His testimony can be seen on YouTube.

Cuomo is currently the VP of Technology within IBM's Consulting business unit, where he is driving the technical strategy for AI-powered automation. In 2022, he published the book The Art of Automation. Later that year, he launched the Think series with his book Think Blockchain, and in 2024, expanded the series with Think Artificial Intelligence. He also hosts a technology podcast called Wild Ducks, which has been running since 2020.
