= Abraham Silberschatz =

American computer scientist

Avi Silberschatz
- אבי זילברשץ
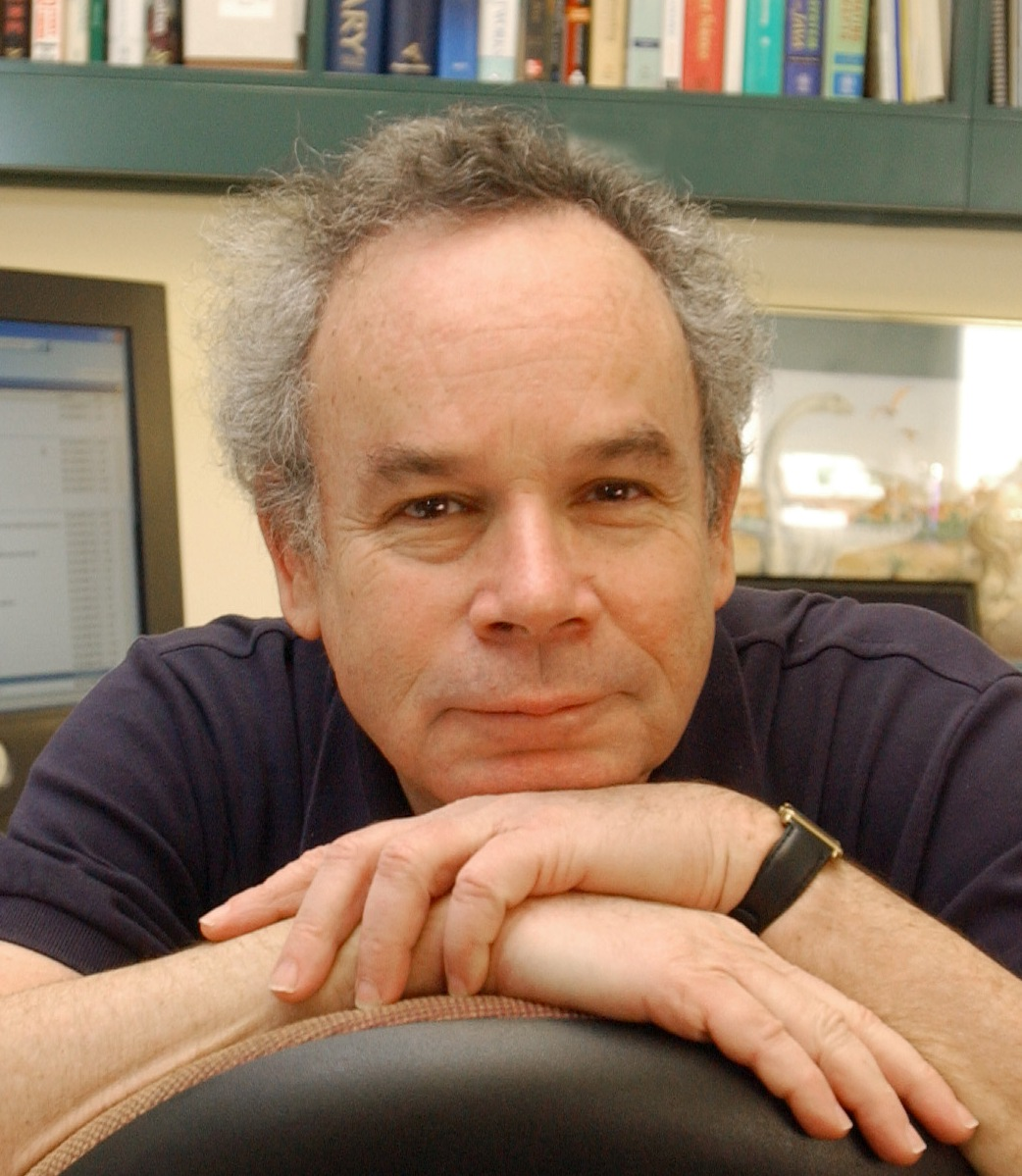
- Education: Stony Brook University; Yale University; The Hebrew Reali School
- Known for: database systems operating systems
- Awards: ACM Fellow; IEEE Fellow; AAAS Fellow; IEEE Taylor L. Booth Education Award (2002); ACM Karl V. Karlstrom Outstanding Educator Award (1998); ACM SIGMOD Contribution Award (1997); 2019 VLDB Test of Time Award
- Scientific career
- Fields: Computer Science
- Workplaces: Yale University
- Doctoral advisor: Arthur Bernstein; Richard Kieburtz
- Doctoral students: C. Mohan; Raghu Ramakrishnan
- Website: http://www.cs.yale.edu/~avi/

Avi Silberschatz (Hebrew: אבי זילברשץ; born in Haifa, Israel) is an Israeli computer scientist and researcher. He is known for having authored many influential texts in computer science. He finished high school at the Hebrew Reali School in Haifa and graduated in 1976 with a Ph.D. in computer science from the State University of New York (SUNY) at Stony Brook. His research interests include database systems, operating systems, storage systems, and network management.

He held a professorship at the University of Texas at Austin, where he taught until 1993. He became a professor at Yale University in 2005, where he was the chair of the Computer Science department from 2005 to 2011. Prior to coming to Yale in 2003, Silberschatz worked at the Bell Labs.

== Awards and recognition ==
Silberschatz was elected an ACM Fellow in 1996 and received the Karl V. Karlstrom Outstanding Educator Award in 1998.

He was elected an IEEE fellow in 2000 for contributions to the development of computer systems dealing with the efficient manipulation and processing of information.

He received the IEEE Taylor L. Booth Education Award in 2002 for "teaching, mentoring, and writing influential textbooks in the operating systems and database systems areas".

He was elected an AAAS fellow in 2009.

Silberschatz is a member of the Connecticut Academy of Science and Engineering.

== Books ==
Mainframe operating systems have an acquired dinosaur trope that even their manufacturers recognize. Peter B. Galvin, co-author, notes that the series of books became informally known as the dinosaur book due to the illustrations on the front cover depicting the various operating systems as actual dinosaurs.

- Silberschatz, Avi; Galvin, Peter; Gagne, Greg (2019). Operating System Concepts (10th ed.).
- Silberschatz, Avi; Galvin, Peter; Gagne, Greg (2013). Operating System Concepts Essentials (2nd ed.).
- Silberschatz, Avi; Korth, Henry F.; Sudarshan, S. (2020). Database System Concepts (7th ed.).
