= Ching H. Tsang =

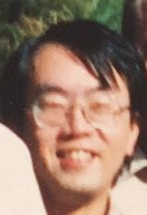
Tsang in 1990

Ching Hwa Tsang is an engineer.

Tsang completed his PhD thesis, titled "Domain wall motions in yttrium orthoferrite", at Stanford University. He was named an IBM Fellow in 1995, and an IEEE Fellow the following year, "[f]or contributions to the design of advanced magnetoresistive heads for rigid disk recording."
