= Jianying Hu =

Chinese-American computer scientist

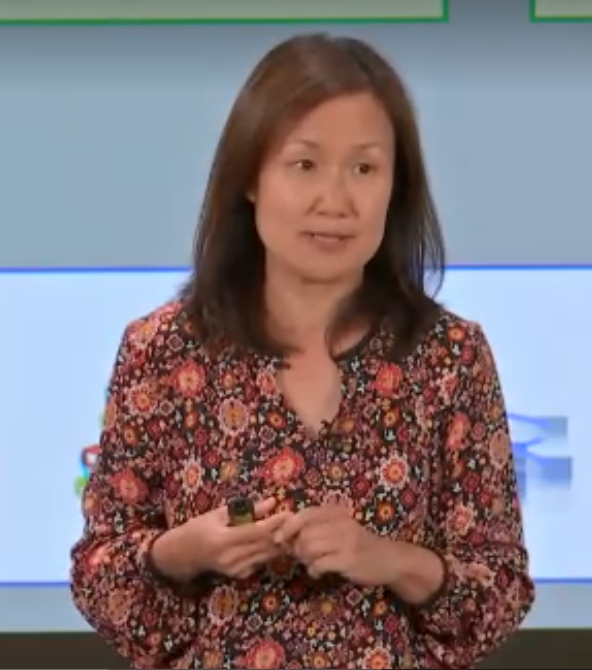

Jianying Hu is a Chinese-American computer scientist at the IBM Thomas J. Watson Research Center, Yorktown Heights, NY, USA, known for her work in data mining, machine learning, artificial intelligence and health informatics. She is an IBM Fellow, Global Science Leader of AI for Healthcare and Director of Healthcare and Life Sciences Research at IBM. She is also an adjunct professor in the Department of Medicine at the Icahn School of Medicine at Mount Sinai. She has published over 150 scientific papers and holds more than 50 patents.

Hu studied electrical engineering at Tsinghua University, Beijing, China, from 1984 to 1988 and received a Ph.D. from Stony Brook University, NY, USA, in 1993. She started her career at Bell Labs, Murray Hill, NJ in 1993, transferred to Avaya Labs Research in 2000 before joining IBM as a Research Staff Member (RSM) in 2003. She was appointed manager in 2011, senior manager and Principal RSM in 2015, program director and Distinguished RSM in 2016, and IBM Fellow in 2018.

Hu was named Fellow of the International Association for Pattern Recognition in 2010 for contributions to pattern recognition methodologies and applications and service to IAPR, Fellow of the Institute of Electrical and Electronics Engineers (IEEE) in 2015 for contributions to pattern recognition in business and health analytics, and document analysis, Fellow of the International Academy of Health Sciences Informatics (IAHSI) in 2020, and Fellow of the American College of Medical Informatics (ACMI) in 2021. In 2013 she was Asian American Engineer of the Year.
