= Henri Nussbaumer =

French engineer (born 1931)

Henri J. Nussbaumer is a French engineer born in Paris, France in 1931.

After graduating in 1954 from the Ecole Centrale Paris, he joined IBM in the Paris development laboratory where he initially worked on solid state circuits. In 1960, he transferred to the IBM Poughkeepsie laboratory and worked on electrodeposition of magnetic films. In 1962, he returned to IBM France in La Gaude as manager of an advanced development group.

He was manager of line switching product development in 1964, manager of technology from 1965 to 1973 and manager of the Education and Technical Vitality Program from 1973 to 1975 when he was named IBM Fellow.

In 1983, Henri Nussbaumer became an IEEE fellow for contributions to the theory and development of line switching and data transmission systems.

Henri Nussbaumer left IBM in 1981 to found the Industrial Computer Engineering laboratory at the Swiss Federal Institute of Technology in Lausanne (EPFL). He was one of the founders of the Institut Eurécom in Sophia Antipolis. Henri Nussbaumer retired in 1996.

== Selected papers ==
- Nussbaumer, Henri J. (September 1976). "Digital Filtering Using Complex Mersenne Transforms". IBM Journal of Research and Development: 498–504.
- Nussbaumer, Henri J. (1976). "Complex Convolutions via Fermat Number Transforms". IBM Journal of Research and Development: 282–284.
- Nussbaumer, Henri J. (1980). "Fast polynomial transform algorithms for digital convolution". IEEE Transactions on Acoustics, Speech, and Signal Processing. 28 (2): 205–215. doi:10.1109/TASSP.1980.1163372.
- Nussbaumer, Henri J. (November 1981). "Pseudo QMF filter bank". IBM Technical Disclosure Bulletin. 24: 3081–3087.

== Books ==
- Nussbaumer, Henri J. (1981). Fast Fourier Transform and Convolution algorithms (1 ed.). Springer-Verlag.
- Nussbaumer, Henri J. Informatique Industrielle (in French). Presses polytechniques et universitaires romandes.
- Nussbaumer, Henri J. Téléinformatique (in French). Presses polytechniques et universitaires romandes.
- Nussbaumer, Henri J. (1990). Computer Communication Systems - Data Circuits, Error Detection, Data Links. Vol. 1. John Wiley & Sons.
- Nussbaumer, Henri J. (1990). Computer Communications Systems - Principles Design Protocols. Vol. 2. John Wiley & Sons.
