= Josephine Cheng =

American computer scientist (born 1953)

Josephine M. Cheng (born 1953) is an American computer scientist.

Cheng's parents were Chinese residing in Vietnam at the time of her birth in 1953. The family later moved to Hong Kong, where Cheng was raised alongside four brothers and two sisters. Chang studied mathematics and computer science at University of California, Los Angeles, completing her Bachelor of Science degree in 1975. She remained at UCLA to earn a Master of Science in computer science in 1977. Cheng then joined what would become IBM's Silicon Valley Laboratory. In 2000, Cheng was named an IBM Fellow. She was elected to membership of the United States National Academy of Engineering in 2006.
