= Alessandro Curioni =

Italian computational scientist

- Alma mater: Scuola Normale Superiore, Pisa
- Known for: CPMD code
- Awards: Gordon Bell Prize (2013, 2015, as team member); IBM Fellow (2014)
- Scientific career
- Fields: Computational science, high-performance computing, quantum computing, artificial intelligence
- Workplaces: IBM Research – Zurich

Alessandro Curioni picture 2017

Alessandro Curioni is an Italian computational scientist. He is an IBM Fellow, Vice President of IBM Research Europe and Africa, and director of the IBM Research – Zurich laboratory in Rüschlikon, Switzerland. He was one of the developers of the CPMD code for ab initio molecular dynamics, and was a member of the teams awarded the ACM Gordon Bell Prize in 2013 and 2015.

== Education ==
Curioni received his undergraduate degree in theoretical chemistry and his PhD from the Scuola Normale Superiore in Pisa, Italy.

== Career ==
Curioni started at IBM Research – Zurich as a PhD student in 1993 and joined the laboratory as a research staff member in 1998; he later became the manager of its Cognitive Computing and Computational Sciences department. He was appointed an IBM Fellow in 2014.

In April 2015 he was named vice president and director of IBM Research – Zurich, succeeding Matthias Kaiserswerth. His responsibilities were later expanded to Vice President of IBM Research Europe and Africa, and he leads IBM Research's global work on algorithms and applications.

== Research ==
Curioni's research concerns high-performance computing and computational science. He was one of the developers of CPMD, a parallelized plane-wave/pseudopotential implementation of density functional theory designed for Car–Parrinello (ab initio) molecular dynamics; he coordinated the CPMD consortium established in 2001 to oversee the code's development and distribution and served as the code's maintainer. In 2022 IBM released CPMD as free software under the MIT License.

In 2013, Curioni was a member of the team awarded the ACM Gordon Bell Prize for petascale simulations of cloud cavitation collapse, carried out on the Sequoia IBM Blue Gene/Q supercomputer at Lawrence Livermore National Laboratory. In 2015, he was a member of the team awarded the Gordon Bell Prize for an extreme-scale implicit solver simulating flow in the Earth's mantle, which scaled to over 1.5 million processor cores.

== Awards and honors ==
- ACM Gordon Bell Prize, as a member of the winning teams (2013, 2015)
- IBM Fellow (2014)
- Elected individual member of the Swiss Academy of Engineering Sciences (SATW) (2017)
