= Kirsten Moselund =

Danish engineer

Kirsten Emilie Moselund
- Education: École Polytechnique Fédérale de Lausanne; Technical University of Denmark; Henriette Hoerlück Skole
- Scientific career
- Workplaces: IBM Research; École Polytechnique Fédérale de Lausanne
- Thesis: Three-dimensional electronic devices fabricated on a top-down silicon nanowire platform (2008)

Kirsten E. Moselund is a Danish engineer who is a professor of electronics and microtechnology at École Polytechnique Fédérale de Lausanne. She also leads the Laboratory for Nano and Quantum Technologies at Paul Scherrer Institute. She previously worked as Head of the Materials Integration and Nanoscale Devices group at IBM Research.

== Early life and education ==
Moselund grew up in Denmark, where she attended Henriette Hoerlück Skole. She completed a master's degree at the Technical University of Denmark. In 2003, she moved to the École Polytechnique Fédérale de Lausanne, where she completed her doctoral research in microelectronics, developing electronic devices from silicon nanowires.

== Research and career ==
Moselund joined IBM Research, where she led a group dedicated to "Materials Integration and Nanoscale Devices". She was particularly interested in neuromorphic engineering, nanophotonics and Quantum computing. She was involved with the development of active nanowire devices for photonics. Making use of both active and passive nanowire matrices, Moselund developed platforms that could interface with neurons. These nanowire based devices can be used to study cell assembly and actively monitor individual cells. Moselund was part of the European Commission project Ionic Neuromodulation For Epilepsy Treatment (IN-FET). She has also worked on vertical-external-cavity surface-emitting-laser (VECSELs).

In 2016, Moselund was awarded a European Research Council starting grant to develop plasmonically enhanced III–V nanowire lasers on silicon for integrated communications (PLASMIC). She focused on plasmonic materials that were compatible with Very Large Scale Integration (VLSI) processing. To achieve this, she made use of Template Assisted Selective Epitaxy, which integrates the nanowires on a Si-SiO_{2} substrate. Central to this technique is the use of an oxide cavity, which guides growth from a tiny silicon surface.

Moselund returned to École Polytechnique Fédérale de Lausanne, where she was made Professor of Electrical and Microengineering. In February 2022, she was made Head of the LNQ (Laboratory Nano and Quantum Technologies).

== Personal life ==
Moselund has two sons.

== Selected publications ==
- Mattias Borg; Heinz Schmid; Kirsten Moselund; et al. (19 March 2014). "Vertical III-V nanowire device integration on Si(100)". Nano Letters. 14 (4): 1914–1920. doi:10.1021/nl404743j. ISSN 1530-6984. PMID 24628529. Wikidata Q87441020.
- Schmid, H.; Borg, M.; Moselund, K.; Gignac, L.; Breslin, C. M.; Bruley, J.; Cutaia, D.; Riel, H. (8 June 2015). "Template-assisted selective epitaxy of III–V nanoscale devices for co-planar heterogeneous integration with Si". Applied Physics Letters. 106 (23): 233101. Bibcode:2015ApPhL.106w3101S. doi:10.1063/1.4921962. ISSN 0003-6951.
- Moselund, K. E.; Schmid, H.; Bessire, C.; Bjork, M. T.; Ghoneim, H.; Riel, H. (October 2012). "InAs–Si Nanowire Heterojunction Tunnel FETs". IEEE Electron Device Letters. 33 (10): 1453–1455. Bibcode:2012IEDL...33.1453M. doi:10.1109/LED.2012.2206789. ISSN 1558-0563. S2CID 36878464.
