= Evangelos S. Eleftheriou =

Greek electrical engineer

Evangelos Eleftheriou (Greek: Ευάγγελος Ελευθερίου) is a Greek electrical engineer. He is an IBM Fellow and was responsible for the Cloud and Computing Infrastructure department at the IBM Research – Zurich laboratory in Rüschlikon, Switzerland.

== Education and research interests ==
Eleftheriou graduated in 1979 from the University of Patras, Greece, with a B.S. degree in Electrical Engineering. He then attended Carleton University in Ottawa, Canada, where he obtained his M.Eng.(1981) and Ph.D. (1985) degrees in Electrical Engineering.

He joined the Research Staff of IBM Research – Zurich laboratory in Rüschlikon, Switzerland, in 1986. Prior to his retirement, he was the head of its Cloud and Computing Infrastructure department.

He holds over 150 patents (granted or pending) and has authored or co-authored about 200 scientific publications.

== Research activities ==
Eleftheriou performed basic research in noise-predictive detection, which found wide application in magnetic recording systems and spurred further research on advanced noise-predictive schemes for a variety of stationary and non-stationary noise sources. In this context, he developed the reduced state sequence detection approach, which is also the basic idea behind the so-called Noise-Predictive Maximum Likelihood (NPML) detection for magnetic recording. This work in its various instantiations, including iterative detection/decoding schemes, is the core technology of the read channel module in hard-disk drives (HDDs) and tape drive systems. The Eduard Rhein Foundation said Eleftheriou had "a pioneering role in the introduction of innovative digital signal processing and coding techniques into hard disk drives".

In 2001, he started to work on a concept that IBM's 1986 Nobel laureate Gerd Binnig had originated, namely, to use atomic force microscopy to not only image surfaces, but to also manipulate the surface of soft materials, such as polymers, and write information in the form of nanometer-scale indentations. This concept is now known as probe-based storage or informally as the so-called Millipede Storage. Together with his team, he demonstrated a small-scale, form-factor prototype storage system using thermomechanical probes, which achieved error-free writing and read back of data at an ultrahigh areal density of 840 Gb/in2, then a world record for data storage. The "millipede" work was selected as "Technology of the Year" by the US trade publication IndustryWeek in 2003.

Through this effort improvements were made in the field of nanopositioning research, a key enabling technology for investigating and engineering matter at the nanometer scale, for a variety of applications that include not only data storage, but also molecular biology, metrology, nano lithography and scanning probe microscopy.

Eleftheriou co-developed the progressive edge growth (PEG) algorithm, a general method for constructing regular and irregular Tanner graphs having a large girth. This algorithm is of great importance in graph theory as well as for constructing powerful short-block-length LDPC codes, a methodology used extensively f in recording and transmission systems

Since 2007, he and his team have increasingly focused on phase-change memory (PCM) as a storage-class memory bridging the gap between memory and storage. They have investigated how to store more than one bit per cell or so-called MLC (multi-level cell) PCM. They have successfully tackled the problem of long-term resistance drift in MLC PCM by using novel read-out metrics. Furthermore, using a new device concept in which the physical mechanism of writing is decoupled from the read process, they were able to eliminate drift; they call this new concept "projected PCM devices".

Using these technologies, the organization demonstrated the application of Phase Change Memory (PCM) through a 3-bit-per-cell large-scale demonstration.

They have also investigated carbon as memory material, focusing in particular on oxygenated amorphous carbon to address the issue of low endurance due to the difficulty of breaking the conductive carbon filaments. In oxygenated amorphous carbon, oxygen is added as a dopant to facilitate the breaking of the carbon filaments because it is known that carbon-based materials, when exposed to oxygen, break down by so-called Joule heating.

Very recently, he and his team have focused on mimicking the unprecedented computational capabilities of the human brain to build ultra-low power cognitive computing systems.

They have built artificial synapses and spiking neurons using phase-change materials, and showed that the inherent stochasticity of these neurons enables population-based computation, similar to the way the human brain processes information. Using the all phase-change neuromorphic architecture, they demonstrated the basic computational primitive of a temporal correlation detector.

== Awards and honors ==
Elected to the National Academy of Engineering - Class 2018 for contributions to digital storage and nanopositioning technologies, as implemented in hard disk-, tape-, and phase-change memory storage systems.

Appointed Fellow of the IEEE, 2001

2005 Technology Award of the Eduard Rhein Foundation, Germany

Appointed an IBM Fellow, 2005

Inducted into IBM Academy of Technology, 2005

IEEE Control System Society's Control Systems Technology Award, December 2009

Honoris Causa Professor, from the University of Patras, 9 November 2016
