= Ed Kahan =

Executive at IBM

- Born: November 21, 1952; Ponta Grossa, Brazil
- Died: March 13, 2010 (aged 57); Orlando, Florida
- Education: Ryerson University
- Known for: IBM Architecture Description Standard (ADS); IBM Software Development Method
- Awards: Blue Chip award Golden Circle awards Hundred Percent clubs IBM Fellow (2005) IBM Fellows Nomination
- Scientific career
- Fields: Computer Science
- Workplaces: IBM

Eduardo T. Kahan (November 21, 1952 – March 13, 2010) was an executive at IBM for 26 years. He was named a distinguished engineer in 1997 and awarded the designation of IBM Fellow in 2005. Kahan was the Chief Architect and CTO of the IBM Software Group, Enterprise Integration and was a certified consultant and an active member of the IBM Academy of Technology. His responsibilities included strategy development, design, and development of advanced technologies for Web Services, service oriented architectures, and enterprise integration products, tools, and solutions for IBM clients.

Kahan developed the IBM Architecture Description Standard (ADS), used by the IBM WW technical community, and authored the IBM Software Development Method.

== Personal life ==
Kahan was born in Ponta Grossa, Brazil, on November 21, 1952, to Israel and Hilda Cohen. When he was nine, his family moved to Israel. Later they joined a Kibbutz (an agricultural, business and social co-op) called Ein Harod where he spent most of his teenage years, and until completing his Israeli army service at 21. Kahan and his family wanted him to have an education more advanced than what the kibbutz area high school could provide, so he attended ORT Singalovski school in Tel Aviv, two hours away, where he had to room and board.

Kahan was a diligent student. Several English-proficient students were asked to interview with a visiting Canadian women's group from Toronto ORT to become the spokesperson for their organization and travel to Canada to speak to their ORT groups. They selected Kahan and welcomed him into the homes of the members in Toronto. The women offered to sponsor him for college in Toronto after his high school and army service. Kahan accepted and earned a degree in mechanical engineering from Ryerson Polytechnic. In 1981, he moved to Houston, Texas. Kahan married Judy Schiff Kahan and had a son Daniel, and a daughter Michelle.

Kahan died at age 57 on March 13, 2010, at his residence in Orlando following a short, intense battle with cancer.

== Career ==
Kahan started his career with Bruel and Kjaer in Denmark in acoustic, vibration, and signal analysis research in Europe and US. His special research interests involved the effect of vibration on humans in industrial settings (hand, arm, and whole-body vibration) and the link between business models and technology.

On joining IBM in 1984 in Houston, Kahan worked on engineering design systems, manufacturing systems, and many complex business systems for IBM clients worldwide.

Kahan held systems engineering, development, and teaching positions in IBM divisions.

As one of the lead company architects, Kahan developed the IBM Architecture Description Standard (ADS), used by the IBM WW technical community, and authored the IBM Software Development Method.

At the peak of his career in IBM, Kahan was the Chief Architect and CTO of the IBM Software Group, Enterprise Integration. Kahan was a certified consultant and an active member of the IBM Academy of Technology.

Kahan spent two years (2007–2009) on assignment in IBM Israel Software Lab (ILSL), before he returned to the US. During those years in Israel, Kahan became a mentor to many in the lab, influenced ILSL technical directions, and helped drive new customer engagements.

Kahan worked as an executive at IBM for 26 years.

== Patents ==
1. 20100058162 AUTOMATIC CUSTOMIZATION OF DIAGRAM ELEMENTS April 3, 2010

2. 20100058161 AUTOMATIC MANAGEMENT OF DIAGRAM ELEMENTS April 3, 2010

3. 20100053215 CREATION AND APPLICATION OF PATTERNS TO DIAGRAM ELEMENTS April 3, 2010

4. 20090210384 VISUALIZATION OF CODE UNITS ACROSS DISPARATE SYSTEMS Aug 20, 2009

5. 20090182752 AUTOMATICALLY PERSISTING DATA FROM A MODEL TO A DATABASE Jul 16, 2009

6. 20090119225 METHOD AND SYSTEM FOR PROVIDING A UNIFIED MODEL FOR CANDIDATE SERVICE ASSETS July 5, 2009

7. 20090113544 ACCESSING PASSWORD PROTECTED DEVICES Apr 30, 2009

8. 20090113382 AUTOMATED DEPLOYMENT IMPLEMENTATION WITH A DEPLOYMENT TOPOLOGY MODEL Apr 30, 2009

9. 20090113381 AGGREGATION OF CONSTRAINTS ACROSS PROFILES Apr 30, 2009

10. 20090112909 AUTOMATED GENERATION OF MODELING LANGUAGE PROFILES Apr 30, 2009

11. 20090112567 PRELIMINARY DATA REPRESENTATIONS OF A DEPLOYMENT ACTIVITY MODEL Apr 30, 2009

12. 20090112566 AUTOMATED GENERATION OF EXECUTABLE DEPLOYMENT CODE FROM A DEPLOYMENT ACTIVITY MODEL Apr 30, 2009

13. 20090070777 Method for Generating and Using Constraints Associated with Software Related Products December 3, 2009
