= Hanan Samet =

American computer scientist

- Education: Stanford University
- Scientific career
- Workplaces: University of Maryland
- Doctoral students: Aya Soffer

Hanan Samet is a Computer Science researcher and Distinguished University Professor at the University of Maryland's Computer Science Department, which is part of the University of Maryland College of Computer, Mathematical, and Natural Sciences. He completed his PhD at Stanford University in 1975.

Samet is a pioneer in research on quadtrees and other multidimensional spatial data structures for sorting spatial information, and has written several well-received books. He has profoundly influenced the theory and application of these areas of research and his impact can be seen in many real-world applications including Google Earth, the world’s most widely used graphics application.

== Awards ==
- 2020 Distinguished Career in Computer Science, Washington Academy of Sciences
- 2013 University of Maryland Distinguished University Professor
- 2012 Paris Kanellakis Theory and Practice Award
- 1996 Fellow Association for Computing Machinery
- 1996 Fellow International Association for Pattern Recognition
- 1991 Fellow Institute of Electrical and Electronics Engineers
