= Dakshi Agrawal =

Indian-American electrical engineer

Dakshi Agrawal, from the IBM Thomas J. Watson Research Center, Yorktown Heights, New York.

Agrawal obtained his B.Tech. degree from Indian Institute of Technology Kanpur in 1993 and two years later received his M.S. from the Washington University in St. Louis as well as his Ph.D. in 1999 from the University of Illinois at Urbana–Champaign, all of which were in electrical engineering. From 1999 to 2000 he worked as a visiting assistant professor at UIUC and in 2000, joined the Thomas J. Watson Research Center of IBM, in Hawthorne, New York as a research scientist. Since 2006 he serves as manager of the Network Management Research Group at the Thomas J. Watson Research Center.

He was named Fellow of the Institute of Electrical and Electronics Engineers (IEEE) in 2012. "for contributions to theory, analysis, and design of efficient, secure, and privacy-preserving communication systems" and in 2017, he became an IBM Fellow.
