= Ted Selker =

American computer scientist

Edwin Joseph Selker, better known as Ted Selker, is an American computer scientist known for his user interface inventions.

== Biography ==
Selker graduated from Brown University in 1979 with a BS in Applied Mathematics, and from the University of Massachusetts Amherst with an MS in Computer and Information Sciences in 1981. From June 1981 to 1983 he worked as research assistant in the Stanford University, Robotics Laboratory. One of his projects was a collaborative display system for the WAITS system of the Stanford Artificial Intelligence Laboratory (SAIL). He worked for Atari for a year, then returned to Stanford to teach for a year.

Selker joined IBM in August 1985, first at the Thomas J. Watson Research Center. He graduated with a PhD from City University of New York in 1992. His thesis was titled "A Framework for Proactive Interactive Adaptive Computer Help". He then moved to the IBM Almaden Research Center where he founded and directed the User Systems Ergonomics Research lab. He was made an IBM Fellow in 1996. Selker holds 67 US patents. He developed the pointing stick (known as TrackPoint) technology which are the distinctive feature of the ThinkPad line of laptop computers (designed, developed and sold by IBM but produced by Lenovo since 2005).

Selker joined the MIT faculty in September 1999. He headed the Context Aware Computing group at the MIT Media Lab and was the MIT director of The Voting Technology Project and Design Intelligence. He joined the faculty of Carnegie Mellon Silicon Valley In November 2008 to help create its PhD program and to head the Considerate Systems group. From June to August 2011 he was the Director of Research at start-up Scanadu. Scanadu aims to turn smart phones into medical monitoring devices.

He has taught at Stanford University, Hampshire College, University of Massachusetts Amherst, and Brown University and consulted at Xerox PARC. His work often takes the form of bleeding edge prototype concept products, for example hybrid search engines, and is supported by cognitive science research into human computer interaction.

He is regarded as a pioneer in the field of context awareness and has been cited in the media. Selker's technologies have been featured on Good Morning America, ABC, the Wall Street Journal, the BBC, NPR, and the Discovery channel among others.

In recognition of his work in voting technology; he was co-recipient of computer science policy leader award for Scientific American 50 in 2004, and in the American Association for People with Disabilities Thomas Paine award in 2006.

He advocates a crowd model of innovation that he calls Excubation.

He is married with two children.
