= Hans Pfeiffer =

German physicist

Hans-Christian Pfeiffer (January 7, 1937 - November 15, 2022) was a German physicist best known for his contribution to the development of electron beam lithography. He is the original inventor of variable-shaped beam (VSB) electron-beam projection system while at IBM. He remained active in the mask making community through consulting after retirement, most notably with VISTEC, a electron beam projection company based in Jena, Germany. He continued to be active in the mask making community most notably the annual BACUS conference, most recently as SPIE PUV Symposium in Monterey, California in the fall.

== Impact of Variable-Shaped Beam (VSB) mask writing ==
Dr. Pfeiffer is recognized for building the industry's first shaped beam lithography systems. He is the lead inventor of the foundational patent US 4243866, Hans C. Pfeiffer; Philip M. Ryan; Edward V. Weber, "Method and apparatus for forming a variable size electron beam", published 1981-01-06, assigned to International Business Machines Corporation. The VSB writing method, as it became known after commercialization in the mid-1980s by JEOL and Toshiba Machines (now NuFlare), became the dominant photomask writing technology. Even after multibeam mask writing technology became available starting about 2018 through IMS Nanotechnology and NuFlare Technology, VSB writing is still the dominant mask writing technology in the world as of 2026.

== Life ==
Hans-Christian Pfeiffer was born on January 7, 1937 in Krumhermsdorf, Saxony, Germany.

Dr. Pfeiffer received his Ph.D. from Technische Universität Berlin in 1967 and joined IBM the following year. During his career he established a world class team and led the development of several generations of IBM's electron-beam lithography systems.

Dr. Pfeiffer was elected IBM Fellow in 1985.

He lived in Carmel Valley, California and was a fixture at the annual BACUS conference in Monterey, California.

He died on November 15, 2022.
