= Rama Akkiraju =

American computer scientist

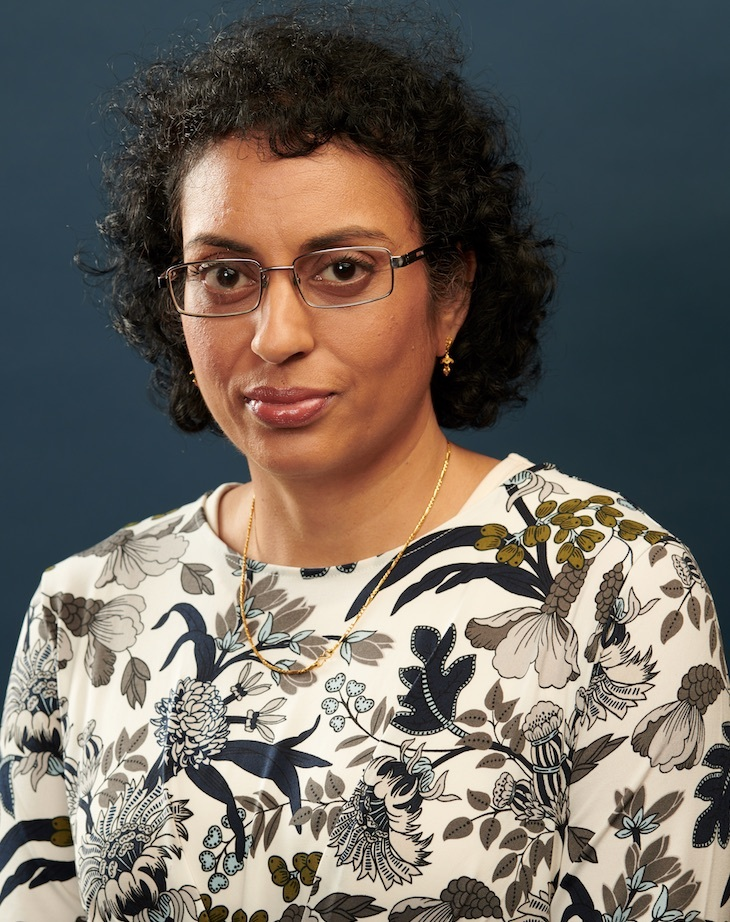
- Education: New York University Stern School of Business (MBA); Utah State University; Jawaharlal Nehru Technological University, Anantapur
- Employer: Nvidia
- Known for: Artificial intelligence; Machine learning; Natural language processing; Business process management; Semantic web services; Decision support systems
- Awards: Athena Award for Executive and Technical Leadership (2020); ISSIP Excellence in Service Innovation Award for People Insights (2019); ISSIP Excellence in Service Innovation Award for AI Operations (2020); Decision Sciences Journal Best Article Award (2009); WAEC99 Best Paper Award (1999)

Rama Kalyani T. Akkiraju is an Indian-born American computer scientist. She is vice president of AI/ML for IT at Nvidia and performs research in the field of artificial intelligence.

Akkiraju started her career at the T. J. Watson Research Center in New York and later moved to IBM Almaden Research Center. She served as the Distinguished Engineer and Director of Engineering at IBM's Watson Division from 2015 to 2019.

Akkiraju was named an IBM Fellow in 2019. She has been an IBM Master Inventor since 2014.

== Education ==
Akkiraju received her MBA at New York University, Stern School of Business in 2004, where she earned a gold medal for highest academic excellence. She received her M.S. in Computer Science from Utah State University in 1995 and her B.Tech. in Electronics engineering from JNTU College of Engineering, in Andhra Pradesh, India in 1993.

== Professional contributions ==
Akkiraju served as the President for ISSIP, a Service Science professional society for 2018, and actively drives AI projects through ISSIP. Akkiraju is the co-chair for the AI Council at CompTIA industry forum. Akkiraju has served as program committee chair, and program committee member for various academic conferences & journals including those organized by IEEE, ACM, ICSE, and ASPLOS.

While at IBM, Akkiraju led the "People Insights" on the IBM Watson team, developing technologies to infer personalities, emotions, tone, attitudes, and intentions from social media data.

Akkiraju has co-authored over 100 technical papers. Akkiraju has 45+ issued patents and 25+ pending. She is the recipient of 4 best paper awards in AI and Operations Research areas from AAAI and INFORMs.

Akkiraju has delivered many keynote addresses, podcasts and blog posts on artificial intelligence, bias, AI for IT operations(AIOps) etc.

== Awards and honors ==
- May 2017: Top 20 Women in AI Research, Forbes
- July 2018: A-Team in AI, Fortune
- December 2019: Top 10 pioneering women in AI and Machine Learning, Enterprise Management 360
- 2020: Athena Award for Executive Leadership, University of California
- 2019, 2020: Excellence in Service Innovation Award, International Society of Service Innovation Professionals
- 2021: Nominee, women in AI Award, VentureBeat
- 2022: AI in Industry - AI Innovator of the Year, Women in AI Awards 2022 North America
- 2022: AI Leader of the Year, Women Leaders in Data and AI (WLDA)
- 2023 ASEI Engineer of the Year - AI, American Society of Engineers of Indian Origin (ASEI)

== Selected publications ==
- Akkiraju, Rama, Joel Farrell, John A. Miller, Meenakshi Nagarajan, Amit P. Sheth, and Kunal Verma. "Web service semantics-wsdl-s." (2005).
- Doshi, Prashant, Richard Goodwin, Rama Akkiraju, and Kunal Verma. "Dynamic workflow composition: Using markov decision processes." International Journal of Web Services Research (IJWSR) 2, no. 1 (2005): 1–17.
- Akkiraju, Rama, Richard Goodwin, Prashant Doshi, and Sascha Roeder. "A Method for Semantically Enhancing the Service Discovery Capabilities of UDDI." In IIWeb, pp. 87–92. 2003.
- Elmeleegy, Hazem, Anca Ivan, Rama Akkiraju, and Richard Goodwin. "Mashup advisor: A recommendation tool for mashup development." In 2008 IEEE International Conference on Web Services, pp. 337–344. IEEE, 2008.
