= Jean Calvignac =

Jean Louis Calvignac is an IBM Fellow and was responsible for the architecture of PowerNP, an IBM network processor. He holds more than 220 patents.

== Career ==
In 1998, at the IBM Laboratory in the Research Triangle Park, Calvignac and his team initiated the IBM network processor activities. He had previously been responsible for system design of the ATM switching products, which he initiated with his team in 1992 at the IBM Laboratory in La Gaude, France. Before that, he had held different management and technical leader positions for architecture and development of communication controller products at the La Gaude Laboratory. Calvignac joined IBM in 1971 as a development engineer in telephone switching products. He received an engineering degree in 1969 from the Grenoble Institute of Technology, France.

Calvignac has been awarded more than 220 patents, mostly in the field of communication and networking. He has contributed to standards and a few scientific papers.

He was named an IBM Fellow in 1997, IBM's highest technical honor. Calvignac is a Fellow of the IET (in Europe) and a Senior Member of the IEEE.
