= Kyle Brown (computer scientist) =

American computer scientist

Kyle Gene Brown (born October 20, 1967) is an American computer scientist at IBM, Durham, North Carolina, USA, known for his work in software design pattern. He is an IBM Fellow. He has published ten books, over 100 commercial articles and papers, and holds more than 25 patents. He was the program chair for the Pattern Languages of Programs Conference in 2002 and again in 2018.

== Books ==
Books he has written or co-written include:

- Kyle Brown; Sherman Alpert; Bobby Woolf (February 1998). The Design Patterns Smalltalk Companion. ISBN 978-0-201-18462-4.
- Kyle Brown; Gary Craig; Greg Hester; Jaime Niswonger; David Pitt (May 2001). Enterprise Java Programming with IBM WebSphere. ISBN 978-0-201-61617-0.
- Gregor Hohpe; Bobby Woolf; Kyle Brown; Martin Fowler; Sean Neville; Michael J Rettig; Jonathan Simon (October 2003). Enterprise Integration Patterns. Addison-Wesley Professional. ISBN 978-0-321-20068-6.
- Kyle Brown; Gary Craig; Greg Hester; Jaime Niswonger; David Pitt (December 2003). Enterprise Java Programming with IBM WebSphere (2nd Ed). Addison-Wesley Professional. ISBN 978-0-321-18579-2.
- Jon Thomas; Matthew Young; Kyle Brown; Andrew Glover (October 2004). Java Testing Patterns. ISBN 978-1-884-84250-4.
- Roland Barcia; Geoffrey Hambrick; Kyle Brown; Robert Peterson; Kulvir Singh Bhogal (May 2008). Persistence in the Enterprise: A Guide to Persistence Technologies. ISBN 978-0-131-58756-4.
- Roland Barcia; Kyle Brown; Karl Bishop; Matthew Perrins (June 2014). Modern Web Development with IBM WebSphere: Developing, Deploying, and Managing Mobile and Multi-Platform Apps. Pearson Education. ISBN 978-0-133-06703-3.
- Moe Abdula; Roland Barcia; Kyle Brown; Ingo Averdunk; Ndu Emuchay (May 2018). The Cloud Adoption Playbook. John Wiley & Sons. ISBN 978-1-119-49181-1.
