= Henry F. Korth =

American computer scientist

- Education: Ph.D., M.A., M.S.E., and A.B
- Alma mater: Williams College; Princeton University
- Awards: ACM Fellow; IEEE Fellow
- Scientific career
- Fields: Computer Science
- Workplaces: Lehigh University
- Thesis: Locking Protocols: General Lock Classes and Deadlock Freedom
- Doctoral advisor: Jeffrey D. Ullman

Henry Francis Korth is a professor of Computer Science and Engineering. He is a fellow of the Association for Computing Machinery (ACM) and of the IEEE. He is one of the coauthors of the university textbook Database System Concepts.

== Early life and education ==
Korth holds an A.B degree in mathematics from Williams College in Williamstown, Massachusetts. Later he studied at Princeton University and graduated in 1979 for M.A. and M.S.E. degrees. After that he completed his Ph.D. from Princeton University in 1981. His dissertation title was Locking Protocols: General Lock Classes and Deadlock Freedom.

== Career ==
Korth served on the faculty of the Department of Computer Sciences at the University of Texas at Austin, where he held the rank of associate professor with tenure from 1983 to 1992.

Later, he held positions of leadership with Lucent Technology's Bell Laboratories in Murray Hill, N.J., as Director of Database Principles Research.

He led the Department of Computer Science and Engineering at Lehigh University from 2003 to 2009.

For many years, he served as co-director of the Computer Science and Business program at Lehigh University.

The Blockchain Lab is currently led by Korth.

== Books ==
Korth published the textbook Database System Concepts with Avi Silberschatz in 1986. As of 2024 it is in its seventh edition. When he was elected a fellow of the ACM the citation read "For significant and lasting influence to principles and practice of database management. Service to community via a bestseller undergraduate textbook, student mentoring and leadership role in industry."

The Mobile Computing Book was published in 1996.

His work has been cited over 16,000 times.

== Awards ==
Korth was elected a fellow of the ACM in 2000. He became a fellow of the IEEE in 2003 for "contributions to the principles and practice of database management."
