= Mark Dean (computer scientist) =

American inventor and computer engineer

Mark Edward Dean
- Born: March 2, 1957 (age 69); Jefferson City, Tennessee, United States
- Education: B.S., Electrical Engineering, 1979, University of Tennessee; M.S., Electrical Engineering, 1982, Florida Atlantic University; Ph.D., Electrical Engineering, 1992, Stanford University
- Occupation: Computer engineer
- Organization: IBM
- Parent(s): James Dean, Barbara Dean

Mark Edward Dean (born March 2, 1957) is an American inventor and computer engineer. He developed the ISA bus with his partner Dennis Moeller, and he led a design team for making a one-gigahertz computer processor chip. He holds three of nine PC patents for being the co-creator of the IBM personal computer released in 1981. In 1995, Dean was named the first ever African-American IBM Fellow.

Dean was elected as a member into the National Academy of Engineering in 2001.

In 2000, Mark discussed a hand held device that would be able to display media content, like a digital newspaper. In August 2011, Dean stated that he uses a tablet computer instead of a PC in his blog.

== Early life ==
Mark Dean was born in Tennessee. He loved Computing from a young age. Dean would sometimes work with his father an engineer. Their biggest project was a tractor. He wanted to be a computer scientist in Primary school ( Middle School). At Secondary school (High School) he excelled at Athletics and academics. During the 1970s, Dean is the first African - American to become an IBM fellow, which is the highest level of technical excellence at the company.

Dean was born in Jefferson City, Tennessee. Dean displayed an affinity for technology and invention at a young age. His father, James, worked with electrical equipment for turbines and spillways. Dean's father would often bring him on work trips, introducing him to engineering. When Dean was young, he and his father constructed a tractor from scratch. In middle school, Dean had made up his mind on becoming a computer engineer. He attended Jefferson City High School in Tennessee, where he excelled in both academics and athletics. While in high school during the 1970s, Dean is the first African-American to become an IBM Fellow, which is the highest level of technical excellence at a company. In 1997, he was inducted into the National Inventors Hall of Fame. He was elected to the National Academy of Engineering in 2001. In 1997, Dean was awarded the Black Engineer of the Year Presidents Award. From August 2018 to July 2019, Dean was the interim dean of the UT's Tickle College of Engineering.

As of April 26, 2019, April 25 is officially Mark Dean Day in Knox County, Tennessee.

== Career and Achievements ==
Dean graduated with a bachelors in electrical engineering during 1979. Soon after, he got a job at IBM as an engineer. His first task at the company was to create a word processor adapter for the IBM System/23 Datamaster microcomputer. During this time, he also created the ISA bus that allowed additional components to be connected to a PC. His work got him promoted in 1982 to chief engineer of PC design, where he worked with a team to develop the IBM PC. In the same year, Dean earned his master's degree in electrical engineering. In 1999, Dean and his team developed a gigahertz microchip, the first in the world.

Dean was the President overseeing the company's Almaden Research Center in San Jose, California. At one point, Dean was CTO for IBM Middle East and Africa. He retired from the company in 2013 and became a professor at University of Tennessee. Mark Dean is the John Fisher Distinguished Professor in the Department of Electrical Engineering and Computer Science at the University of Tennessee.

Dean now holds more than 20 patents, and his work led to development of the color PC monitor.

== Patents by Mark Dean ==
Name of Patent	Patent Number	Date of Patent	Inventor(s)
Color video display system having programmable border color	4437092	March 13, 1984	Mark E. Dean, Lewis C. Eggebrecht, David A. Kummer, Jesus A. Saenz
Composite video color signal generation from digital color signals	4442428	April 10, 1984	Mark E. Dean, David A. Kummer, Jesus A. Saenz
Microcomputer system with bus control means for peripheral processing devices	4528626	July 9, 1985	Mark E. Dean, Dennis L. Moeller
Refresh generator system for a dynamic memory	4575826	March 11, 1986	Mark E. Dean
Data processing system including a main processor and a co-processor and co-processor error handling logic	4598356A	July 1, 1986	Mark E. Dean, Dennis Lee Moeller
Computer system including a page mode memory with decreased access time and method of operation thereof	5034917	July 23, 1991	Patrick M. Bland, Mark E. Dean
Method and apparatus for selectively posting write cycles using the 82385 cache controller	5045998	September 3, 1991	Ralph M. Begun, Patrick M. Bland, Mark E. Dean
Bidirectional buffer with latch and parity capability	5173619A	April 21, 1992	Patrick Maurice Bland, Kevin Gerrard Kramer, Mark E. Dean, Susan Lynn Tempest, Gene Joseph Gaudenzi
Control of pipelined operation in a microcomputer system employing dynamic bus sizing with 80386 processor and 82385 cache controller	5125084	June 23, 1992	Ralph M. Begun, Patrick M. Bland, Mark E. Dean
System bus preempt for 80386 when running in an 80386/82385 microcomputer system with arbitration	5129090	July 7, 1992	Patrick M. Bland, Mark E. Dean, Philip E. Milling
Microprocessor hold and lock circuitry	5170481	December 8, 1992	Ralph M. Begun, Patrick M. Bland, Mark E. Dean
Delayed cache write enable circuit for a dual bus microcomputer system with an 80386 and 82385	5175826	December 29, 1992	Ralph M. Begun, Patrick M. Bland, Mark E. Dean
Data processing apparatus for selectively posting write cycles using the 82385 cache controller	5327545	July 5, 1994	Ralph M. Begun, Patrick M. Bland, Mark E. Dean
Connecting a short word length non-volatile memory to a long word length address/data multiplexed bus	5448521A	September 5, 1995	Sean E. Curry, Mark E. Dean, Marc R. Faucher, James C. Peterson, Howard C. Tanner
Microcomputer system employing address offset mechanism to increase the supported cache memory capacity	5450559	September 12, 1995	Ralph M. Begun, Patrick M. Bland, Mark E. Dean
System and method for prefetching information in a processing system	5544342A	August 6, 1996	Mark E. Dean
Non-contiguous mapping of I/O addresses to use page protection of a process	5548746A	August 20, 1996	Gary D. Carpenter, Mark E. Dean, Marc R. Faucher, James C. Peterson, Howard C. Tanner
Self-time processor with dynamic clock generator having plurality of tracking elements for outputting sequencing signals to functional units	5553276	September 3, 1996	Mark E. Dean
Method and system for reading from a m-byte memory utilizing a processor having a n-byte data bus	5603041A	February 11, 1997	Gary D. Carpenter, Mark E. Dean
Method and system in a distributed shared-memory data processing system for determining utilization of nodes by each executed thread	6266745B1	July 24, 2001	Philippe L. de Backer, Mark E. Dean, Ronald Lynn Rockhold
Method and system in a distributed shared-memory data processing system for determining utilization of shared-memory included within nodes by a designated application	6336170B1	January 1, 2002	Mark E. Dean, James Michael Magee, Ronald Lynn Rockhold, Guy G. Sotomayor Jr., James Van Fleet
Data storage device for recording to magnetic thread	7206163B2	April 17, 2007	Diana J. Hellman, Mark E. Dean
Method and apparatus for constructing a neuroscience-inspired artificial neural network with visualization of neural pathways	9753959	September 5, 2017	J. Douglas Birdwell, Mark E. Dean, Margaret Drouhard, Catherine Schuman
Method and apparatus for constructing, using and reusing components and structures of an artificial neural network	10019470B2	July 10, 2018	J. Douglas Birdwell, Mark E. Dean, Catherine Schuman
Method and apparatus for providing random selection and long-term potentiation and depression in an artificial network	10055434	August 21, 2018	J. Douglas Birdwell, Mark E. Dean, Catherine Schuman
Method and apparatus for constructing a dynamic adaptive neural network array (DANNA)	10095718	October 9, 2018	J. Douglas Birdwell, Mark E. Dean, Catherine Schuman
Method and apparatus for providing real-time monitoring of an artificial neural network	10248675	April 2, 2019	J. Douglas Birdwell, Mark E. Dean, Catherine Schuman
