= John Cohn =

American engineer

Dr John Cohn
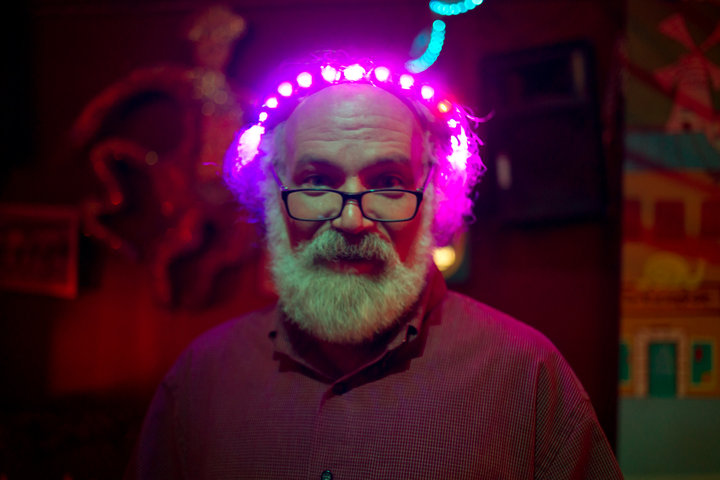
- John Cohn giving a talk at TEDx Delft in 2013.
- Born: February 9, 1959 (age 66); Manhattan, New York, United States
- Occupation(s): IBM Fellow and Computer Engineer
- Spouse: Diane Mariano
- Children: Max, Sam (Died 2006), Gabe

John Maxwell Cohn (born February 9, 1959) is an American engineer. Cohn is best known as the engineer scientist in the Discovery Channel TV show, The Colony. He is an IBM Fellow at the MIT-IBM Watson AI Laboratory. Previous to that, John was Chief Scientist of the Internet of Things division. He holds an undergraduate electrical engineering degree from the Massachusetts Institute of Technology, and a doctoral degree from Carnegie Mellon University. Cohn has authored over 40 papers and has more than 120 worldwide patents.

Cohn's presentation concerning electricity, entitled Jolts and Volts, has been performed by more than 50,000 students worldwide, including performances at Walt Disney World, and the New York Hall of Science.

In October 2013, Cohn presented a TEDx conference. TEDxDelft 2013 was themed "Do try this at home," and Cohn's talk was titled "The importance of play."
