= Ruchir Puri =

Ruchir Puri is an Indian American scientist, CTO and chief architect of IBM Watson, an IBM Fellow and currently Chief Scientist of IBM Research. He is a Fellow of the IEEE, a member of IBM Academy of Technology and IBM Master Inventor, an ACM Distinguished Speaker and IEEE Distinguished Lecturer. Ruchir received Semiconductor Research Corporation's outstanding mentor award. He was a visiting scientist at the Dept. of Computer Science, Stanford University, CA, and an adjunct professor at the Dept. of Electrical Engineering, Columbia University, NY and was awarded John Von-Neumann Chair at Institute of Discrete Mathematics at Bonn University, Germany. Ruchir received the 2014 Asian American Engineer of the Year Award. He has delivered numerous keynotes and invited talks at major software and hardware conferences. He is an inventor of over 50 United States patents and has authored over 100 publications as well as authored a book on Analyzing Analytics. Ruchir is an active proponent of technology among school children and has been evangelizing fun with electronics and FIRST LEGO League Robotics among middle schools children.

== Selected awards and honors ==
- IBM Fellow, 2012
- IEEE Fellow for “contributions to automated logical and physical design of electronic circuits”, 2007.
- ACM Distinguished Speaker, 2006–present
- SRC – GRC Outstanding Mentor Award for contributions to academic research and student mentoring, 2008.
- IEEE Circuits and Systems Distinguished Lecturer, 2010–2011.
- Asian American Engineer of the Year Award, 2014.
- Best of IBM Award, 2011, 2012.
- IBM Master Inventor, 2009.
- Elected to IBM Academy of Technology, 2009.
- John-Von-Neumann Chair at the Research Institute of Discrete and Applied Mathematics, Bonn University, Germany, 2011.
