= Maja Vuković =

Computer Scientist at IBM Research

- Education: University of Cambridge
- Scientific career
- Fields: Artificial intelligence
- Workplaces: IBM Research

Maja Vuković is a computer scientist, doing research in Artificial intelligence, Blockchain and Cloud Software among others. She has been appointed an IBM Fellow in 2021 and in IBM she was responsible for technical and research strategy for AI driven Application Modernization.

== Education and career ==
She received her Bachelor of Science with a double major in Computer Science and Mathematics from the University of Auckland, New Zealand, a degree in Computer Science from the International University in Germany in 2000, and a PhD in Computer Science from the University of Cambridge in 2006, for her work on context-aware service composition using AI planning.

== Research interests ==
Her research interests span different areas, including: AI for Application Modernization; Cloud Transformation, Infrastructure Discovery, Cloud Automation; AI Planning, Machine Learning; Enterprise Crowdsourcing; and Social Web for Disaster Management among others.

Maja is a member of IBM Academy of Technology and an IBM Master Inventor, with over 180 patents granted, including the "Coffee Delivery Drone" patent.

She is a Senior Member of IEEE and a Senior Editor at the ACM Ubiquity journal.

She is a frequent podcaster and has been interviewed at major conferences.

She is currently involved in an open source community for app modernization.

== Awards and honors ==
Maja was awarded the Women in Services Computing Award by IEEE in 2018.
