= C. Mohan =

Indian-born American computer scientist

- Born: 3 August 1955 (age 71); Tamil Nadu, India
- Citizenship: United States
- Education: Indian Institute of Technology, Madras (1972–1977); University of Texas, Austin (1977–1981)
- Known for: ARIES; Database systems Distributed database Presumed Abort Commit Protocol; Transaction processing Workflow management Blockchain; Distributed ledger
- Spouse: Kalpana Mohan
- Children: Pavithra Mohan; Parthiv Mohan
- Awards: US National Academy of Engineering 2009; ACM SIGMOD Edgar F. Codd Innovations Award 1996; IBM Fellow 1997; IEEE Fellow 2002; ACM Fellow 2002; Indian National Academy of Engineering 2009; Distinguished Visiting Professor, Tsinghua University 2016; Distinguished Alumnus Award, IIT Madras 2003
- Scientific career
- Fields: Computer Science
- Workplaces: Tsinghua University (2016–); IBM (1981–2020); Kerala Blockchain Academy (2020–); Tamil Nadu e-Governance Agency (2019–); INRIA (1998–1999)
- Thesis: Strategies for enhancing concurrency and managing deadlocks in data base locking protocols (1981)
- Doctoral advisor: Abraham Silberschatz

Chandrasekaran Mohan is an Indian-born American computer scientist. He was born on 3 August 1955 in Tamil Nadu, India. After growing up there and finishing his undergraduate studies in Chennai, he moved to the United States in 1977 for graduate studies, naturalizing in 2007. In June 2020, he retired from being an IBM Fellow at the IBM Almaden Research Center (San Jose, California) after working at IBM Research for 38.5 years. Currently, he is a visiting professor at China's Tsinghua University. He is also an Honorary Advisor at the Tamil Nadu e-Governance Agency (TNeGA) in Chennai and an advisor at the Kerala Blockchain Academy in Kerala.

== Education ==
Mohan received his PhD in computer science from the University of Texas at Austin in 1981. He received a B.Tech. in chemical engineering from IIT Madras in 1977. He had his pre-college education in Vellore, Tamil Nadu.

== Career ==
After finishing his PhD in the database area in December 1981, Mohan joined IBM Research in San Jose, working on projects like R*, Starburst, Exotica, and DBCache. He subsequently worked as a visiting scientist at INRIA Rocquencourt in 1998–1999, then returned to IBM. From June 2006 until January 2009, he worked as the IBM India Chief Scientist, based in Bangalore.

After his return to IBM Almaden Research Center at the end of his India assignment, Mohan worked on projects relating to Storage Class Memories, Big Data, Hybrid Transactional/Analytical Processing (HTAP) enhancements to IBM Db2 and Apache Spark, and Blockchain and Distributed ledger technologies. He gave numerous keynotes and other talks on NoSQL, NewSQL, modern enhancements to classic RDBMSs and Big Data.

Since 2017, he has lectured on blockchain and distributed ledger technologies, co-organizing seminars and giving a keynote address on the topic. In August 2016, Mohan was named a visiting professor in the School of Software of China's Tsinghua University.

Mohan has published numerous conference and journal papers in the areas of database, workflow and transaction management, and blockchain technologies. According to Google Scholar, his h-index is 68 and his i10-index is 141. He is the primary inventor of the ARIES family of recovery and concurrency control methods, and the industry-standard (e.g., X/Open XA) Presumed Abort commit protocol. His journal papers on ARIES and Presumed Abort are considered classic papers in the areas of transactions, recovery, distributed commit and locking, and are included in a collection of database papers, informally called the "Red Book", edited by ACM Turing Award winner Prof. Michael Stonebraker and others under a section titled Techniques Everyone Should Know. In the introduction to that section, one of the editors of the Red Book, Peter Bailis, while discussing the ARIES paper, has said "In graduate database courses, this paper is a rite of passage. However, this material is fundamental, so it is important to understand." In the ACM SIGMOD Record series called Reminiscences on Influential Papers, with reference to the ARIES paper, Prof. Betty Salzberg of Northeastern University has said: "The ARIES paper was important for me because it enabled me to envision the mechanisms of recovery in database systems clearly. ... Reading the ARIES paper influenced much of my subsequent research. ... Now it is almost impossible for me to imagine thinking of a database system without ARIES style recovery." Prof. Alan Fekete of University of Sydney, as part of the abstract of a keynote talk by him in February 1993 said the following: "In the past few years, there have been several exciting advances in transaction management that seem certain to influence future commercial systems. One is the invention and publication of improved techniques for implementation of transaction management. In particular, an exciting series of papers have come from the ARIES project led by C. Mohan at IBM Almaden Research Laboratory. There are new algorithms which provide concurrency control for B-tree indices, recovery compatible with fine-grained locking, and concurrency control allowing long-running audits."

Mohan has worked closely with many IBM product groups worldwide and his research results have been implemented in numerous IBM and non-IBM prototypes, and products like IBM Db2, MQSeries, IBM WebSphere, Informix, Cloudscape, IBM Notes, Microsoft SQL Server and IBM System z Parallel Sysplex.

In a 2003 interview conducted by Marianne Winslett as part of the ACM SIGMOD "Distinguished Database Profiles" series, Mohan discussed the first 20 years of his IBM career. Video and audio recordings, and the textual transcript of that interview were published. That interview provides a historical perspective on the state of the database research and products landscape then and also on Computer Science work in India. It also discusses Mohan's most important research results and how they came about. A Chinese translation of this interview's transcript is also available.

Mohan worked as a technologist during his entire 38.5 years professional career at IBM and avoided becoming a manager! He has often talked about the importance of long-term technical careers with sustained focus in one area to attain excellence and to be effective in innovation. Especially in a developing country like India, during his IBM India Chief Scientist assignment as well as at other times, he has often emphasized the need for good technical people to stay technical and not be too attracted by a management career path. In a front-page story back in August 2007, Business Standard, one of India's leading newspapers, discussed Mohan's senior most technical position at IBM and elaborated on his patenting activities.

== Awards ==
Mohan's research, publications, inventions and technology transfer contributions have been well appreciated both inside and outside IBM over the decades via numerous awards and other recognition.

In February 2009, Mohan was elected to the United States National Academy of Engineering (NAE) "for contributions to locking and recovery algorithms for database systems". During the same year, he was also elected as a Foreign Fellow of the Indian National Academy of Engineering (INAE). He received the 1996 Association for Computing Machinery (ACM) SIGMOD Edgar F. Codd Innovations Award in recognition of his innovative contributions to the development and use of database systems. He was the first non-American and the fifth person ever to receive that award. The first 4 winners in chronological order were Michael Stonebraker, Jim Gray, Phil Bernstein and David DeWitt. Later, the first two won the Association for Computing Machinery (ACM) Turing Award.

In 2002, Mohan was named an ACM Fellow and an IEEE Fellow. At the 1999 International Conference on Very Large Data Bases (VLDB), he was honored with the 10 Year Best Paper Award for the widespread commercial and research impact of his ARIES work which has been widely covered in textbooks and university courses.

In 2003, Mohan was named a Distinguished Alumnus of his undergraduate alma mater IIT Madras. In discussing Mohan's accomplishments, that award citation says: "He has played a key role in establishing the foundations of database systems, which are at the core of modern information infrastructure, that support modern society. His work is among the lessons taught to students of database systems across the world. He has won numerous awards and holds key patents. It is rare for the work of one person to have had such a significant research, commercial and societal impact".

From IBM, Mohan has received 2 Corporate and 8 Outstanding Innovation/Technical Achievement Awards. He is an inventor on 50 issued/pending patents and was named an IBM Master Inventor in 1997.

== Professional contributions ==
Mohan has discussed his IBM and non-IBM professional activities in and outside Silicon Valley in a short video. He is a frequent speaker in North America, Western Europe and India, and has given talks in 40 countries.

Mohan has been on the advisory board of IEEE Spectrum and an editor of VLDB Journal, and Distributed and Parallel Databases. He was a Steering Council member of IBM's Software Group Architecture Board, and a member of IBM's Technical Leadership Team (TLT), IBM Academy of Technology, and Information Management Architecture Board. In the past, he has also been a member of IBM's Research Management Council (RMC), IBM India's Senior Leadership Team, the IBM Asset Architecture Board, and the Bharti and Vodafone Technical Advisory Councils. He also served on the academic senate of the International Institute of Information Technology (IIIT) at Bangalore.
