= Ravi Arimilli =

Indian inventor

Ravi Kumar Arimilli (born 1963) is an IBM Fellow and Chief Architect. Largely responsible for development of the POWER5, he is one of the most prolific inventors in the world, being awarded 78 patents in 2002 and a further 53 in 2003. He has over 507 patents to his name and is listed among the most prolific inventors in the world as measured by U.S. utility patents.

Arimilli moved with his family to the United States from Andhra Pradesh, India, in 1969. He studied at Louisiana State University, and joined IBM in 1985. His expertise includes symmetric multiprocessing (SMP) system structures, cache/memory hierarchies and system bus protocols.
