= Jaishankar Menon =

American computer scientist (1956–2022)

- Born: August 9, 1956
- Education: Indian Institute of Technology (B.S.); Ohio State University (Ph.D.)
- Occupation(s): Computer scientist and researcher

Jaishankar Menon (born August 9, 1956) is an Indian-American computer scientist and researcher.

== Life and career ==
Menon joined IBM's research team in San Jose, California, in 1982, where he developed RAID (Redundant Array of Independent Disks) technology.

== Awards ==
- IBM Fellow, 2001
- IEEE Fellow
- Winner of the 2002 IEEE W. Wallace McDowell Award
- 2006 IEEE Reynold B. Johnson Information Storage Systems Award
- IBM Master Inventor
