= Aya Soffer =

Israeli computer scientist

- איה סופר
- Education: Hebrew U. (B.S.); U. of Maryland (Ph.D.)
- Employer: IBM
- Scientific career
- Thesis: Retrieval by Content in Symbolic-Image Databases (1995)
- Doctoral advisor: Hanan Samet
- Website: IBM Research profile

Aya Chasia Soffer (Hebrew: איה סופר) is an Israeli computer scientist, vice president for AI Technology in IBM Research, and the director of IBM's Israel research laboratory.

== Education and career ==
Soffer is the daughter of two scientists. She received her bachelor's degree from the Hebrew University of Jerusalem in 1986 and worked in the medical imaging industry for four years before continuing to the department of computer science at the University of Maryland, College Park where she received a master's degree in 1992 and her PhD in 1995. Her dissertation, Retrieval by Content in Symbolic-Image Databases, concerned information retrieval, and was supervised by Hanan Samet.

After receiving her PhD she worked for the Goddard Space Flight Center as a research scientist working on NASA digital libraries for Earth science data. She began working at IBM in 1999. She was part of the IBM Watson project, and beginning in 2012, IBM's Project Debater, before taking on her current responsibilities as vice president for AI Technology and head of the Haifa laboratory for IBM Research.

== Recognition ==
Soffer was named one of the most influential women ("Power Women") by Forbes Israel in 2019, in 2020 she was named of the 100 most influential people influencing life in Israel by TheMarker, and in 2021 one of the 50 most influential women in Israel by Globes
