= Tamás Galambos =

Hungarian contemporary artist

Tamás Galambos (born 1939, Budapest, Hungary) is a Hungarian contemporary artist. His 1981 painting 'Summer' is featured on the book cover of the Penguin Classics edition of One Hundred Years of Solitude by Gabriel García Márquez. This successful book cover design is also available in a poster format. Another of his main works, the Trojan Horse (1994) is on the cover of the history course book Antiquity 1, published by Oxford University Press.

Tamás Galambos is one of five artists representing Hungarian contemporary art in an introductory piece by the Bridgeman Art Library.
