= Christy Tyberg =

American electronic engineer

Christy Sensenich Tyberg is an American chemist, an IBM Fellow, and Quantum Processor Fabrication Technology Lead for IBM Quantum. Beyond her work on the development of quantum computing devices, she has also worked at IBM on low-kappa dielectrics, on the back end of line stage of CMOS fabrication, and on three-dimensional integrated circuits.

Tyberg completed a doctorate in polymer chemistry at Virginia Tech. She started working for IBM in 2000, and began working on quantum computing in 2016. She was elected as a Fellow of the American Physical Society (APS) in 2021, after a nomination from the APS Forum on Industrial & Applied Physics, "for leadership in scaling superconducting quantum hardware through wafer-level microfabrication and advanced packaging". She became a Distinguished Engineer at IBM, before being named as an IBM Fellow in 2026.
