= George M. Galambos =

Hungarian computer engineer

George Galambos (born in Budapest) is a computer engineer. He is an IBM Fellow (2003), an IBM Distinguished Engineer and a member of the IBM Academy of Technology.

He graduated the Budapest Technical University (Budapest University of Technology and Economics) in 1972, with a Ph.D. in chemical engineering. Prior to which, he studied chemical engineering at the Leningrad Technology Institute (Saint Petersburg State Institute of Technology).

He holds the office of CTO, Global Services (IGS) IBM Canada. Galambos was a designer on the team that built the Interac network connecting bank machines. Galambos advises companies on advanced systems design and strategic IT plans. His current interest includes system design patterns, with a focus on integration.

Galambos holds a patent for 'System and method for transforming an enterprise using a component business model' (Patent #20070174109, Class: 705010000 (USPTO)), A system and method are described for using a Component Business Model (CBM) to transform a business. A CBM map is used to identify components that collaborate to provide a specified capability, and a repository supporting the CBM map is filtered to provide a view of the identified components that highlights how they collaborate. The view is used to identify component features contributing to the specified capability. The specified capability is then enhanced by a transformation strategy that includes re-engineering particular components, identifying a pattern characterizing the collaboration between components and adding a component to perform the collaborative pattern, or adding another feature to the collaboration and adding component to perform the additional feature. The CBM repository provides exemplar best practices that can be adapted for use in a re-engineered component.

== Publications ==
- Patterns for e-business: A Strategy for Reuse, co-authored with Jonathan Adams, Srinivas Koushik, Guru Vasudeva, IBM Press, ISBN 978-1-931182-02-7, Published: 2001, new edition 2008
- "Services Ecosystem, Proceedings of the 2005 IEEE International Conference on Services Computing - Volume 01", IEEE Computer Society, Washington, Page: 20, ISBN 978-0-7695-2408-5, Published: 2005
- "IBM Systems Journal Volume 44, Number 4, 2005, Impact of service orientation at the business level", IBM Press, ISSN 0018-8670, Published:2005
