= Ariel David Soffer =

American cardiologist and professor

- Born: September 21, 1965 (age 61); Washington, D.C., U.S.
- Occupation: Cardiologist

Academic background
- Education: The University of South Florida (Bachelor of Science, Biology, 1986); University of Miami School of Medicine (M.D. with distinction, 1990)

Ariel David Soffer (born September 21, 1965) is an American cardiologist and professor. He is board-certified in cardiovascular disease and internal medicine and is a fellow of the American College of Cardiology.

He heads a venous training program for cardiologists and surgeons and lectures internationally on several circulatory issues.

== Early life and education ==
Soffer was born on September 21, 1965, in Washington, D.C. In July 1982, he enrolled at the University of South Florida Tampa Bay, and received a B.S. degree in biology in 1986. In the same year, he attended the University of Miami's Miller School of Medicine and graduated in 1990 as a medical doctor with distinction, followed by a residency in internal medicine at Cedars-Sinai Medical Center. He completed his residency in 1993.

== Career ==
From 1998, he joined Hollywood Medical Center in Hollywood, Florida as vice-chairman of medicine and became its head of medicine in 2007.

Soffer joined Cardiologist for the National Hockey League's Florida Panthers team as an official physician. In 2009, he joined Jackson Health System.

In 2009, Soffer founded Soffer Health Institute, which specializes in cardiology, venous disease, and rejuvenation.

As of 2022, he is an associate clinical professor of medicine at Nova Southeastern University, where he teaches and lectures medical students. In addition, he is also an associate clinical professor at Florida International University, principal investigator at BTG, and consultant physician trainer at AngioDynamics.

Soffer has worked and has been affiliated with several hospitals, including Aventura Hospital, Jackson North Medical Center, Cleveland Clinic Hospital, Weston, Hollywood Medical Center, Memorial Regional Hospital, Memorial Pembroke Hospital, Memorial West Hospital, North Broward Medical Center, and Westside Regional Medical Center.

He has also been a professional member of colleges, associations, councils, including the American College of Physicians, American College of Cardiology, American Medical Association, American Society of Nuclear Cardiology, and the American Heart Association and American Stroke Association. He is also a member of the Council on Clinical Cardiology, and the Council on Epidemiology and Prevention.

His published papers include research on mitral valve prolapse. He has also published in Vein Therapy News.

== Professional affiliations ==
- Assistant Professor of Medicine, Florida International University, 2010–Present
- Assistant Professor of Medicine, Nova Southeastern University, 2010–Present
- Adjunct Clinical Faculty, Barry University, 2006–Present
- National Clinical Instructor in Endovenous Laser Therapy, 2007 – Present
- Official Cardiologist for NHL's Florida Panthers, September 2004 – 2008
- Governing Board Member, Hollywood Medical Center, June 1998 – June 1999
- Independent Physician Review Service, Av-Med Health Plans - Present
- Regional Adjunct Faculty Member - Vascular Biology, Working Group, University of Florida - 2002–Present
- Medical Executive Committee Member, Hollywood, Florida, 1998-2006
- Cedars-Sinai Medical Center/UCLA - Internship 1990-1993
- Cardiology Fellowship at USC 1993-1995
- Mt. Sinai Medical Center Cardiology Fellowship 1995-1996
- Section Chief of Cardiology at Jackson Health - North Campus 2009-2010

== Personal life ==
Soffer married Ana Maria Soffer in 2003. They have two children, Evan and Shayna.

== Books ==
Soffer has published the Patient's Guide to Mitral Valve Prolapse Syndrome. He has also published the Mediterranean Diet Book.

== Selected publications ==
- Ariel D. Soffer, M.D., Cardiologists and Endovenous Ablation Procedures, Endovascular Today, Varicose Vein Update 2007
- On Topaz, M.D., Germano DiSciascio, M.D., Michael J. Cowley, M.D., Patricia Lanter, M.D., Ariel D. Soffer, M.D., Amar Nath, M.D., Evelyn Goudreau, M.D., A.Arthur Halle, III, M.D., George W. Vetrovec, M.D. Complete Left Main Coronary Artery Occlusion: Angiographic Evaluation of Collateral Vessel Patterns and Assessment of Hemodynamic Correlates, J of American Heart, 1991;122:447.
- On Topaz, M.D., Germano DiSciascio, M.D., Michael J. Cowley, M.D., Evelyn Goudreau, M.D., Ariel D. Soffer, M.D., Amar Nath, M.D., Patricia Lanter, M.D., George W. Vetrovec, M.D., Angiographic Features of Left Main Coronary Artery Aneurysms, J of American Cardiology, 1991;67:1139.
- On Topaz, M.D., Germano DiSciascio, M.D., Michael J. Cowley, M.D., Ariel D. Soffer, M.D., Patricia Lanter, M.D., Evelyn Goudreau, M.D., Amar Nath, M.D., Mark Warner, M.D., George W. Vetrovec, M.D., J of American Heart, 1991;122:447.
