= IBM Fellow =

Appointed position at IBM

- Awarded for: Position at IBM appointed by the IBM CEO
- Sponsored by: IBM
- Date: May or June

An IBM Fellow is a position at IBM appointed by the CEO. Typically only four to nine (eleven in 2014) IBM Fellows are appointed each year, in May or June. Fellow is the highest honor a scientist, engineer, or programmer at IBM can achieve.

== Overview ==
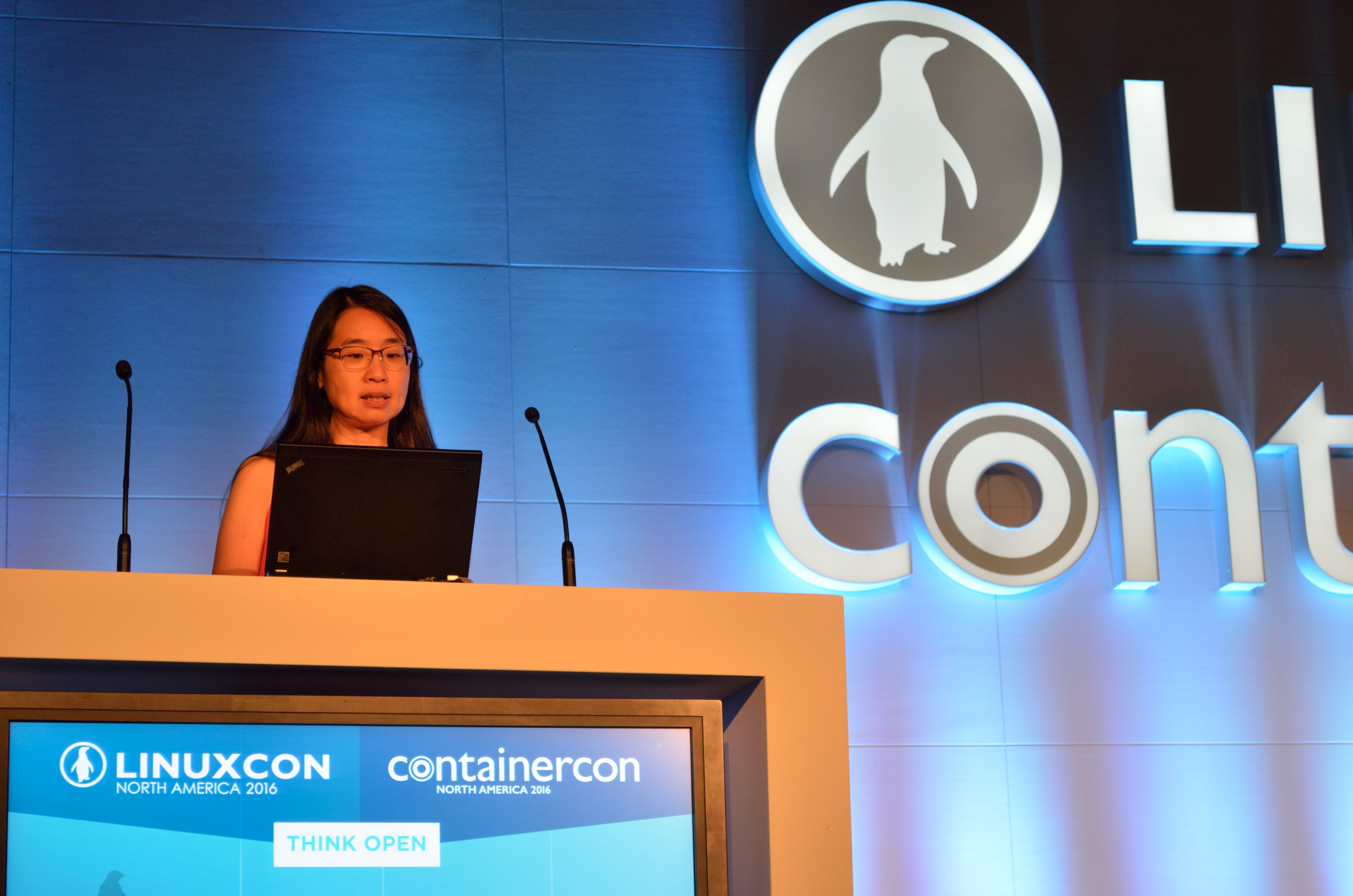
IBM Fellow Donna Dillenberger

The IBM Fellows program was founded in 1962 by Thomas Watson Jr., as a way to promote creativity among the company's "most exceptional" technical professionals and is granted in recognition of outstanding and sustained technical achievements and leadership in engineering, programming, services, science, design and technology. The first appointments were made in 1963.

The criteria for appointment are stringent and take into account only the most-significant technical achievements. In addition to a history of extraordinary accomplishments, candidates must also be considered to have the potential to make continued contributions. Francis E. Hamilton is believed to be the first IBM Fellow, appointed in 1963 for amongst other things his work on the development of the IBM 650. In 1989, Fran Allen became the first female IBM Fellow.

IBM Fellows are given broad latitude to identify and pursue projects in their area of expertise.

As of March 2026, only 341 IBMers have earned the IBM Fellow distinction, and 74 of them remain active IBM employees. IBM Fellows have generated over 9,329 patents and thousands of government and professional citations, received five Nobel Prizes and five Turing Awards, and created a massive store of published research in scientific journals.

== List ==
In chronological order, as of 2026:

- Francis E. Hamilton (1963)
- Ronald D. Dodge (1963)
- C.R. Doty, Sr. (1963)
- Clyde J. Fitch (1963)
- John Backus (1963)
- Genung L. Clapper (1963)
- Lewellyn H. Thomas (1963)
- Ralph L. Palmer (1963)
- Ralph E. Gomory (1964)
- Robert Henle (1964)
- James A. Weidenhammer (1964)
- Laurence A. Wilson (1964)
- Jonas E. Dayger (1964)
- Gene Amdahl (1965)
- Reynold B. Johnson (1965)
- Stephen W. Dunwell (1966)
- George T. Judson (1966)
- James M. Brownlow (1967)
- George F. Daly (1967)
- Wallace Eckert (1967)
- Leo Esaki (1967)
- Richard L. Garwin (1967)
- Jean Ghertman (1967)
- Evon C. Greanias (1967)
- Edward J. Rabenda (1967)
- Nathaniel Rochester (1967)
- Walter Buslik (1968)
- L.R. Harper (1968)
- Peter Sorokin (1968)
- Leon E. Palmer
- E. Alan Brown (1969)
- H.G. Kolsky (1969)
- Rolf Landauer (1969)
- Herman Goldstine (1969)
- Jacob Riseman (1969)*- see Directory
- Charles E. Owen (1969)
- Wouter Vanderkulk (1969)
- D. DeWitt (1970)
- Enrico Clementi (1970)
- Victor R. Witt (1970)
- Kenneth E. Iverson (1971)
- J. B. Gunn (1971)
- Joseph C. Logue (1971)
- Bill Beausoleil (1972)
- John Cocke (1972)
- Shmuel Winograd (1972)
- Harlan Mills (1973)
- R.G. Brewer (1973)
- Robert A. Nelson (1973)
- William E. Harding (1973)
- Dean Eastman (1974)
- Jack Harker (1974)
- Benoît Mandelbrot (1974)
- Charles F. Borteck (1974)
- Harold Fleisher (1974)
- Otto G. Folberth (1974)
- A.R. Heller (1975)
- Henri Nussbaumer (1975)
- Joseph P. Pawletko (1975)
- James H. Pomerene (1976)
- Edgar F. Codd (1976)
- Heinz Zemanek (1976)
- Carl A. Queener (1976)
- Donald K. Rex (1977)
- Thomas H Simpson (1977)
- Alec N. Broers (1977)
- Alan J. Hoffman (1978)
- Robert Dennard (1979)
- Siegfried K. Wiedmann (1979)
- David E. Cuzner (1979)
- David A. Thompson (1980)
- Richard E. Blahut (1980)
- George Radin (1980)
- Robert E. Pattison (1980)
- Donald Seraphim (1981)
- Edward H. Sussenguth (1981)
- Janusz S. Wilczynski (1981)
- K. Alex Müller (1982)
- Edward B. Eichelberger (1982)
- Richard Chu (1983)
- Alan Fowler (1983)
- Charles Denis Mee (1983)
- Werner Kulcke (1983)
- James P. Gray (1984)
- Allan L. Scherr (1984)
- Mu-Yue (Ben) Hsiao (1984)
- Rao R. Tummala (1984)
- Gottfried Ungerboeck (1984)
- Hans Pfeiffer (1985)
- Jerry Woodall (1985)
- G. Glenn Henry (1985)
- C. Grant Willson (1985)
- Gerd Binnig (1986)
- Dale L. Critchlow (1986)
- James M. Kasson (1986)
- Heinrich Rohrer (1986)
- Arvind M. Patel (1986)
- Lubomyr Romankiw (1986)
- Georg Bednorz (1987)
- Edwin R. Lassettre (1987)
- Paul E. Totta (1987)
- Karl Hermann (1987)
- Nick Pippenger (1987)
- Bernard R. Aken, Jr. (1988)
- Michael Hatzakis (1988)
- James L. Walsh (1988)
- Larry Loucks (1989)
- Alfred Cutaia (1989)
- Frances E. Allen (1989)
- Donald Haderle (1989)
- Russell Lange (1989)
- Michael F. Cowlishaw (1990)
- J. Kent Howard (1990)
- Ellis L. Johnson (1990)
- Howard L. Kalter (1990)
- Randolph G. Scarborough (1990)
- Marc Auslander (1991)
- Richard Baum (1991)
- Tak Ning (1991)
- H. Bernhard Pogge (1991)
- Paul H. Bardell (1991)
- Bernard Meyerson (1992)
- Don Eigler (1993)
- Peter Kogge (1993)
- Anthony Temple (1993)
- Charles R. Hoffman (1993)
- Martin E. Hopkins (1993)
- James T Brady (1993)
- Diane Pozefsky (1994)
- Patricia Selinger (1994)
- Celia Yeack-Scranton (1994)
- Johann Greschner (1994)
- Richard R. Oehler (1994)
- Charles H. Bennett (1995)
- Mark E. Dean (1995)
- Michael D. Swanson (1995)
- Ching H. Tsang (1995)
- Brian E. Clark (1996)
- Bijan Davari (1996)
- James Rymarczyk (1996)
- Ted Selker (1996)
- Bruce Lindsay (1996)
- Yutaka Tsukada (1996)
- Ramesh Agarwal (1997)
- Jean Calvignac (1997)
- C. Mohan (1997)
- Ramesh C. Agarwal (1997)
- Cesar A. Gonzales (1998)
- Steven R. Hetzler (1998)
- Tze-Chiang Chen (1999)
- Irene Greif (1999)
- Alex Morrow (1999)
- Stuart Parkin (1999)
- Hamid Pirahesh (1999)
- Gururaj S. Rao (1999)
- Nicholas Shelness (1999)
- Carl J. Anderson (2000)
- Josephine M. Cheng (2000)
- H. Kumar Wickramasinghe (2000)
- Ravi K. Arimilli (2001)
- Donald F. Ferguson (2001)
- Jai M. Menon (2001)
- Joan L. Mitchell (2001)
- Arimasa Naitoh (2001)
- Jeffrey M. Nick (2001)
- Ghavam Shahidi (2001)
- Rakesh Agrawal (2002)
- Michael H. Hartung (2002)
- James A. Kahle (2002)
- Maurice J. Perks (2002)
- Anthony A. Storey (2002)
- Grady Booch (2003)
- Donald D. Chamberlin (2003)
- George M. Galambos (2003)
- Rodney A. Smith (2003)
- Charles F. Webb (2003)
- Phaedon Avouris (2004)
- Curt L. Cotner (2004)
- David L. Harame (2004)
- Audrey A. Helffrich (2004)
- Kevin A. Stoodley (2004)
- Evangelos S. Eleftheriou (2005)
- Larry M. Ernst (2005)
- Ed Kahan (2005)
- Bradley D. McCredie (2005)
- Yun Wang (2005)
- Thomas M. Bradicich (2006)
- John Maxwell Cohn (2006)
- Gennaro A. Cuomo (2006)
- Daniel C. Edelstein (2006)
- Alan Gara (2006)
- Ray Harishankar (2006)
- Kerrie L. Holley (2006)
- Carol A. Jones (2006)
- Brenda L. Dietrich (2007)
- David B. Lindquist (2007)
- Martin P. Nally (2007)
- Edward J. Seminaro (2007)
- Mark N. Wegman (2007)
- Chris C. Winter (2007)
- Emmanuel Crabbé (2008)
- Robert H. High Jr. (2008)
- Hiroshi Ito (2008)
- Susan L. Miller-Sylvia (2008)
- David Nahamoo (2008)
- Pratap Pattnaik (2008)
- Thomas L. Seevers (2008)
- Moshe Yanai (2008)
- Harry M. Yudenfriend (2008)
- Nicholas M. Donofrio (2008)
- Chieko Asakawa (2009)
- Laura M. Haas (2009)
- Michael A. Kaczmarski (2009)
- Hung Q. Le (2009)
- Roger R. Schmidt (2009)
- Martín-J Sepúlveda (2009)
- Satya P. Sharma (2009)
- Tim J. Vincent (2009)
- James C. Colson (2010)
- Jeffrey A. Frey (2010)
- Alfred Grill (2010)
- Subramanian Iyer (2010)
- Anant D. Jhingran (2010)
- Charles Johnson (2010)
- David Ferrucci (2011)
- Renato Recio (2011)
- Bradford Brooks (2011)
- Steven W Hunter (2011)
- Nagui Halim (2011)
- Stefan Pappe (2011)
- Wolfgang Roesner (2011)
- Bob Blainey (2011)
- Luba Cherbakov (2012)
- Paul Coteus (2012)
- Ronald Fagin (2012)
- Vincent Hsu (2012)
- Jeff Jonas (2012)
- Ruchir Puri (2012)
- Balaram Sinharoy (2012)
- Neil Bartlett (2013)
- Jon Casey (2013)
- Monty Denneau (2013)
- Jason McGee (2013)
- John Ponzo (2013)
- Heike Riel (2013)
- Dinesh Verma (2013)
- Chandu Visweswariah (2013)
- Sandy Bird (2014)
- Rhonda Childress (2014)
- Alessandro Curioni (2014)
- Tamar Eilam (2014)
- Mike Haydock (2014)
- Namik Hrle (2014)
- Dharmendra Modha (2014)
- Aleksandra Mojsilović (2014)
- Krishna Ratakonda (2014)
- Shivakumar Vaithyanathan (2014)
- Andy Walls (2014)
- Donna Dillenberger (2015)
- Chitra Dorai (2015)
- Michael Factor (2015)
- Steve Fields (2015)
- Mickey Iqbal (2015)
- Bala Rajaraman (2015)
- Berni Schiefer (2015)
- James Sexton (2015)
- Jing Shyr (2015)
- John Smith (2015)
- Mac Devine (2016)
- Blaine Dolph (2016)
- Stacy Joines (2016)
- Shankar Kalyana (2016)
- Adam Kocoloski (2016)
- Bill Kostenko (2016)
- JR Rao (2016)
- Salim Roukos (2016)
- Ajay Royyuru (2016)
- Gosia Steinder (2016)
- Tanveer Syeda-Mahmood (2016)
- Charlie Hill (2017)
- Dakshi Agrawal (2017)
- Ed Calusinski (2017)
- Hillery Hunter (2017)
- Hugo M. Krawczyk (2017)
- Matt Huras (2017)
- Matthias Steffen (2017)
- Rachel Reinitz (2017)
- Sam Lightstone (2017)
- Sridhar Muppidi (2017)
- Eric Herness (2017)
- Harry Kolar (2018)
- Jay Gambetta (2018)
- Jianying Hu (2018)
- Kyle Brown (2018)
- Mike Williams (2018)
- Paul Taylor (2018)
- Teresa Hamid (2018)
- Vijay Narayanan (2018)
- Ann Corrao (2019)
- Chris Ferris (2019)
- Elpida Tzortzatos (2019)
- Gustavo Stolovitzky (2019)
- Laxmi Parida (2019)
- Ram Viswanathan (2019)
- Rama Akkiraju (2019)
- Rashik Parmar (2019)
- Mohamed Ahmed (2020)
- Ajay Apte (2020)
- Andreas Bieswanger (2020)
- Catherine Crawford (2020)
- Nduwuisi Emuchay (2020)
- Marc Fiammante (2020)
- Kailash Gopalakrishnan (2020)
- Jim Olson (2020)
- Emi Olsson (2020)
- Francesca Rossi (2020)
- Shalini Kapoor (2020)
- Ranjan Sinha (2020)
- Faried Abrahams (2021)
- Roland Barcia (2021)
- Sergey Bravyi (2021)
- Oliver Dial (2021)
- Andrew Hately (2021)
- Nataraj Nagaratnam (2021)
- Tetsuya Nikami (2021)
- Maja Vuković (2021)
- Vita Bortnikov (2022)
- Jerry Chow (2022)
- Christian Jacobi (2022)
- AB Vijay Kumar (2022)
- Marcel Mitran (2022)
- Rosalind Radcliffe (2022)
- Kyle Charlet (2023)
- Natsumi Kurashima (2023)
- Effendi Leobandung (2023)
- Brian Martin (2023)
- Aaron Baughman (2024)
- Trent Gray-Donald (2024)
- Kush Varshney (2024)
- Jeff Mitchell (2026)
- Christy Tyberg (2026)
