= Shmuel Winograd =

Israeli-American computer scientist (1936–2019)

- Born: January 4, 1936; Tel Aviv, Mandatory Palestine
- Died: March 25, 2019 (aged 83); New York, United States
- Education: New York University; Massachusetts Institute of Technology
- Known for: Coppersmith–Winograd algorithm
- Scientific career
- Fields: Computer science
- Workplaces: Technion – Israel Institute of Technology
- Doctoral advisor: Jacob T. Schwartz

Shmuel Winograd (Hebrew: שמואל וינוגרד; January 4, 1936 – March 25, 2019) was an Israeli-American computer scientist, noted for his contributions to computational complexity. He has proved several major results regarding the computational aspects of arithmetic; his contributions include the Coppersmith–Winograd algorithm and an algorithm for the fast Fourier transform which transforms it into a problem of computing convolutions which can be solved with another Winograd's algorithm.

Winograd studied Electrical Engineering at the Massachusetts Institute of Technology, receiving his B.S. and M.S. degrees in 1959. He received his Ph.D. from the Courant Institute of Mathematical Sciences at New York University in 1968. He joined the research staff at IBM in 1961, eventually becoming director of the Mathematical Sciences Department there from 1970 to 1974 and 1980 to 1994.

== Honors ==
- IBM Fellow (1972)
- Fellow of the Institute of Electrical and Electronics Engineers (1974)
- W. Wallace McDowell Award (1974)
- Member, National Academy of Sciences (1978)
- Member, American Academy of Arts and Sciences (1983)
- Member, American Philosophical Society (1989)
- Fellow of the Association for Computing Machinery (1994)

== Books ==
- Winograd, Shmuel (1980). Arithmetic complexity of computations. CBMS-NSF regional conference series in applied mathematics. Vol. 33. Society for Industrial and Applied Mathematics. ISBN 978-0-89871-163-9.
