= Dejan Vuković =

Serbian politician

Dejan Vuković (Serbian Cyrillic: Дејан Вуковић; born 15 October 1978) is a politician in Serbia. He was elected to the Assembly of Vojvodina in the 2020 provincial election as a member of the Movement for the Restoration of the Kingdom of Serbia (Pokret obnove Kraljevine Srbije, POKS).

== Private career ==
Vuković is a graduated mechanical engineer. He lives in Bečej.

== Politician ==
=== Municipal ===
Vukovič sought election to the Bečej municipal assembly in the 2008 Serbian municipal elections, running on a local electoral list called Pokret za Preokret (English: Movement for a Reversal). The list did not cross the electoral threshold to win seats in the assembly. He subsequently joined the Serbian Renewal Movement (Srpski pokret obnove, SPO), which contested the 2012 Serbian local elections in a coalition with the Liberal Democratic Party that was also called Preokret (generally known in English as "U-Turn"). He received the second position on the coalition list and was elected when the list won eight mandates.

His term in the local assembly was brief; he resigned in July 2012. Shortly thereafter, he was appointed to a five-year term as director of the public company Toplana Bečej. In 2017, he was re-appointed to second term.

The SPO experienced a serious split in 2017, and Vuković joined the breakaway POKS.

=== Member of the Assembly of Vojvodina ===
Vuković received the third position on the POKS list for the Vojvodina provincial assembly in the 2020 provincial election and was elected when the list won five mandates. He is a member of the committee on economy and the committee on agriculture.
