= Rakesh Agrawal (computer scientist) =

Indian computer scientist

Rakesh Agrawal (Hindi: राकेश अग्रवाल, romanized: Rākēś Agravāl) is a computer scientist who until recently was a Technical Fellow at the Microsoft Search Labs. Rakesh is well known for developing fundamental data mining concepts and technologies and pioneering key concepts in data privacy, including Hippocratic Database, Sovereign Information Sharing, and Privacy-Preserving Data Mining. IBM's commercial data mining product, Intelligent Miner, grew out of his work. His research has been incorporated into other IBM products, including DB2 Mining Extender, DB2 OLAP Server and WebSphere Commerce Server, and has influenced several other commercial and academic products, prototypes and applications. His other technical contributions include Polyglot object-oriented type system, Alert active database system, Ode (Object database and environment), Alpha (extension of relational databases with generalized transitive closure), Nest distributed system, transaction management, and database machines.

Prior to joining Microsoft in March 2006, Rakesh was an IBM Fellow and led the Quest group at the IBM Almaden Research Center. Earlier, he was with the Bell Laboratories, Murray Hill from 1983 to 1989. He also worked for three years at a leading Indian company, the Bharat Heavy Electricals Ltd. He received his M.S. and Ph.D. degrees in computer science from the University of Wisconsin-Madison in 1983. He also holds a B.E. degree in Electronics and Communication Engineering from IIT-Roorkee, and a two-year Post Graduate Diploma in Industrial Engineering from the National Institute of Industrial Engineering (NITIE), Bombay.

== Research and papers ==
Rakesh has been granted more than 55 patents. He has published more than 150 research papers, many of them considered seminal. He has written the 1st as well as 2nd highest cited of all papers in the fields of databases and data mining (13th and 15th most cited across all computer science as of February 2007 in CiteSeer). Wikipedia lists one of his papers Fast algorithms for mining association rules co-authored with Ramakrishnan Srikant published on VLDB in 1994 as one of the most influential database papers. His papers have been cited more than 6500 times, with more than 15 of them receiving more than 100 citations each. He is the most cited author in the field of database systems. His work has been featured in the New York Times Year in Review, New York Times Science section, and several other publications.
