= Marc Auslander =

American computer scientist

Marc Alan Auslander is an American computer scientist known for his contributions to the PL.8 compiler. He spent his entire career at the IBM Thomas J. Watson Research Center in Yorktown Heights, NY.

Auslander received a Bachelor of Arts degree in mathematics from Princeton University in 1963. He joined IBM the same year. In 1991 he was named an IBM Fellow. He retired in 2004 but continues to be affiliated with IBM as a Fellow Emeritus.

In 1996, Auslander was elected to the National Academy of Engineering for contributions to reduced instruction set computing (RISC) systems. In 1999 he was named both ACM Fellow and IEEE Fellow, again for contributions to RISC.

From 1970 to 1972 Auslander served as chairman of ACM SIGOPS. He has authored 19 scientific papers and holds 14 U.S. patents.
