= Patricia Selinger =

American computer scientist and IBM Fellow

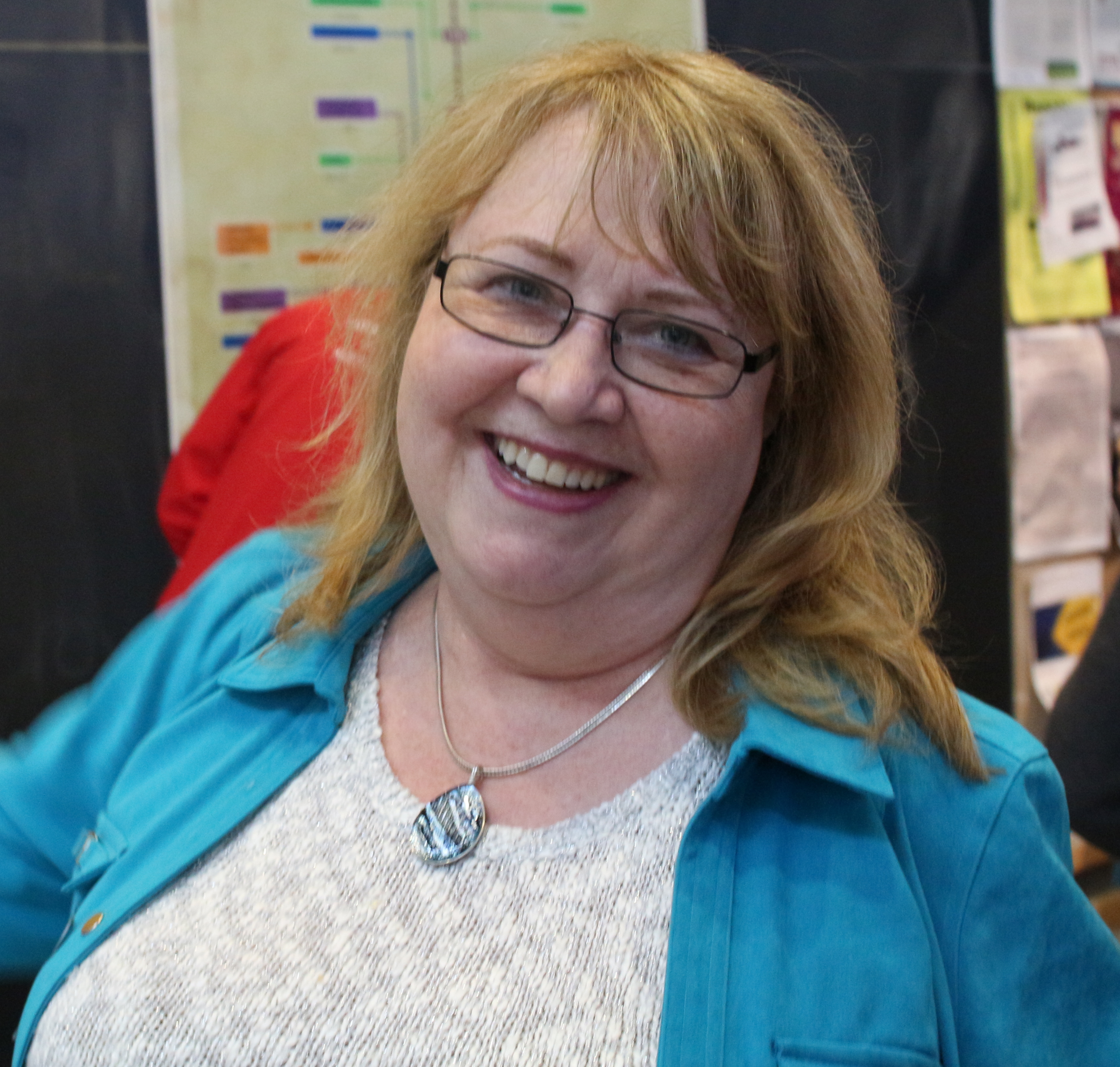
Selinger in 2014

Patricia Griffiths Selinger is an American computer scientist and IBM Fellow, best known for her work on relational database management systems.

== Education ==
She received A.B. (1971), S.M. (1972), and Ph.D. (1975) degrees in applied mathematics from Harvard University.

== Biography ==
She played a fundamental role in the development of System R, a pioneering relational database implementation, and wrote the canonical paper on relational query optimization. She is a pioneer in relational database management and inventor of the technique of cost-based query optimization. She was a key member of the original System R team that created the first relational database research prototype. The dynamic programming algorithm for determining join order proposed in that paper still forms the basis for most of the query optimizers used in modern relational systems. She also established and led IBM’s Database Technology Institute, considered one of the most successful examples of a fast technology pipeline from research to development and personally has technical contributions in the areas of database optimization, data parallelism, distributed data, and unstructured data management. Before her retirement from IBM, she was the Vice President of Data Management Architecture and Technology at IBM.

Dr. Selinger was appointed an IBM Fellow in 1994, IBM’s highest technical recognition, and is an ACM Fellow (2009) and a Fellow of the American Academy of Arts and Sciences. She was also elected a member of the National Academy of Engineering (1999) for leadership and contributions to relational database technology.

Dr. Selinger has published more than 40 papers, and also received the ACM Systems Software Award for her work on System R. She received the SIGMOD Innovations Award in 2002, the highest ACM award given in the area of data management.

From 2014 through 2016, Dr. Selinger was the Chief Technology Officer at Paradata (Paradata.io) where she worked on challenging problems in data harmonization, curation, provenance, and entity resolution to provide transparency to the supply chain. Paradata technology transforms real-time data into verified insights and executable actions.

From 2017 through 2018, Dr. Selinger served as a Principal Architect at Salesforce.com. She is now retired.
