= Ramakrishnan Srikant =

Indian computer scientist

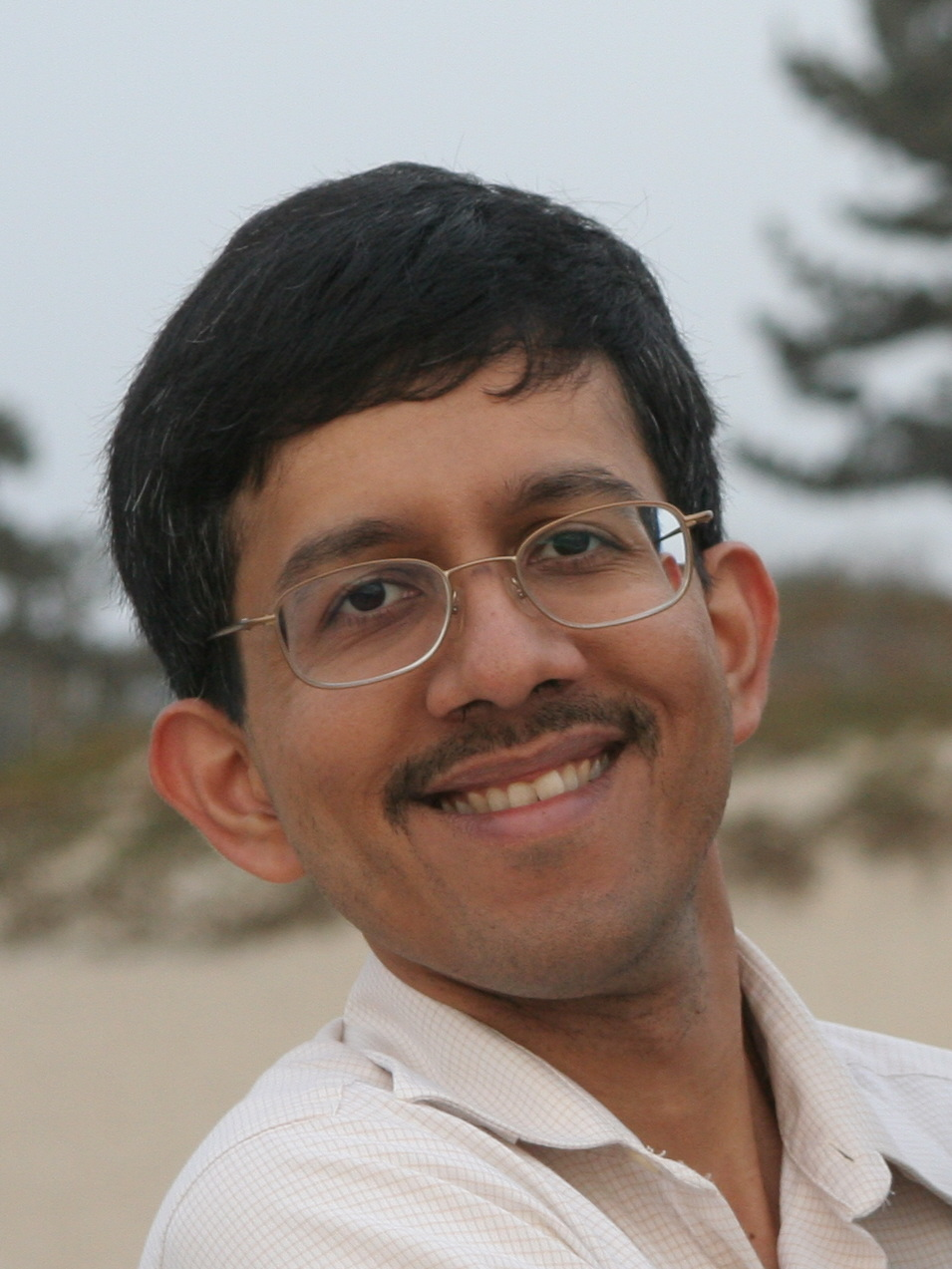
- Ramakrishnan Srikant (2005)
- Education: University of Wisconsin
- Awards: ACM Fellow (2014)
- Scientific career
- Fields: Computer Science
- Workplaces: IBM, Google
- Thesis: Fast Algorithms for Mining Association Rules and Sequential Patterns (1996)
- Doctoral advisor: Rakesh Agrawal; Jeffrey Naughton
- Website: rsrikant.com

Ramakrishnan Srikant is a Google Fellow at Google.

His primary field of research is Data Mining. His 1994 paper, "Fast algorithms for mining association rules", co-authored with Rakesh Agrawal has acquired over 27000 citations as per Google Scholar as of July 2014, and is thus one of the most cited papers in the area of Data Mining. It won the VLDB 10-year award in 2004. His 1995 paper, Mining Sequential Patterns, also co-authored with Rakesh Agrawal, was awarded the ICDE Influential Paper Award in 2008, and his 2004 paper, Order-Preserving Encryption for Numeric Data, co-authored with Rakesh Agrawal, Jerry Kiernan and Yirong Xu, won the 2014 SIGMOD Test of Time Award.

Srikant is a winner of the Grace Murray Hopper Award and was also awarded the SIGKDD Innovation Award in the year 2006.

He was elected to Fellow of ACM (2014) for contributions to knowledge discovery and data mining.
