= List of Women in Technology International Hall of Fame inductees =

The Women in Technology International Hall of Fame was established in 1996 by Women in Technology International (WITI) to honor women who contribute to the fields of science and technology.

== Women in Technology International Hall of Fame inductees ==
=== 1996 ===
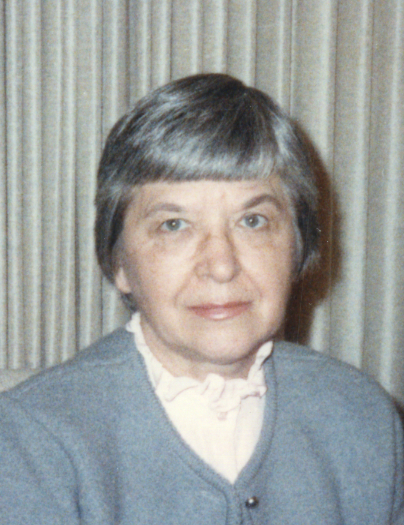
Stephanie L. Kwolek

- Ruth Leach Amonette (1916–2004), IBM's first woman vice president (1943–1953)
- Dr. Eleanor K. Baum (born 1940), American electrical engineer and educator. First female dean of (Cooper Union) School of Engineering. First female president of the American Society for Engineering Education
- Dr. Jaleh Daie (born 1948), managing partner, Aurora Equity, a Palo Alto-based investment company financing technology start ups. Treasurer of US Space Foundation (first woman appointed to its board of directors). Member of Band of Angels
- Dr. Barbara Grant, venture capitalist, former vice president and general manager in the Data Storage Division at IBM
- Stephanie L. Kwolek (1923–2014), inventor of poly-paraphenylene terephthalamide (Kevlar)
- Dr. Misha Mahowald (1963–1996), computational neuroscientist
- Linda Sanford (born 1953), IBM Enterprise Transformation (see also Linda Sanford's Oral History Interview)
- Dr. Cheryl L. Shavers (born 1953), Under Secretary for Technology, US Commerce Department (1999–2001)
- Dr. Sheila Widnall (born 1938), American aerospace researcher and Institute Professor at Massachusetts Institute of Technology. United States Secretary of the Air Force (1993–1997) (first female Secretary of the Air Force). First woman to lead an entire branch of the U.S. military in the Department of Defense
- Dr. Chien-Shiung Wu (1912–1997), Chinese-American physicist who worked on Manhattan Project

=== 1997 ===
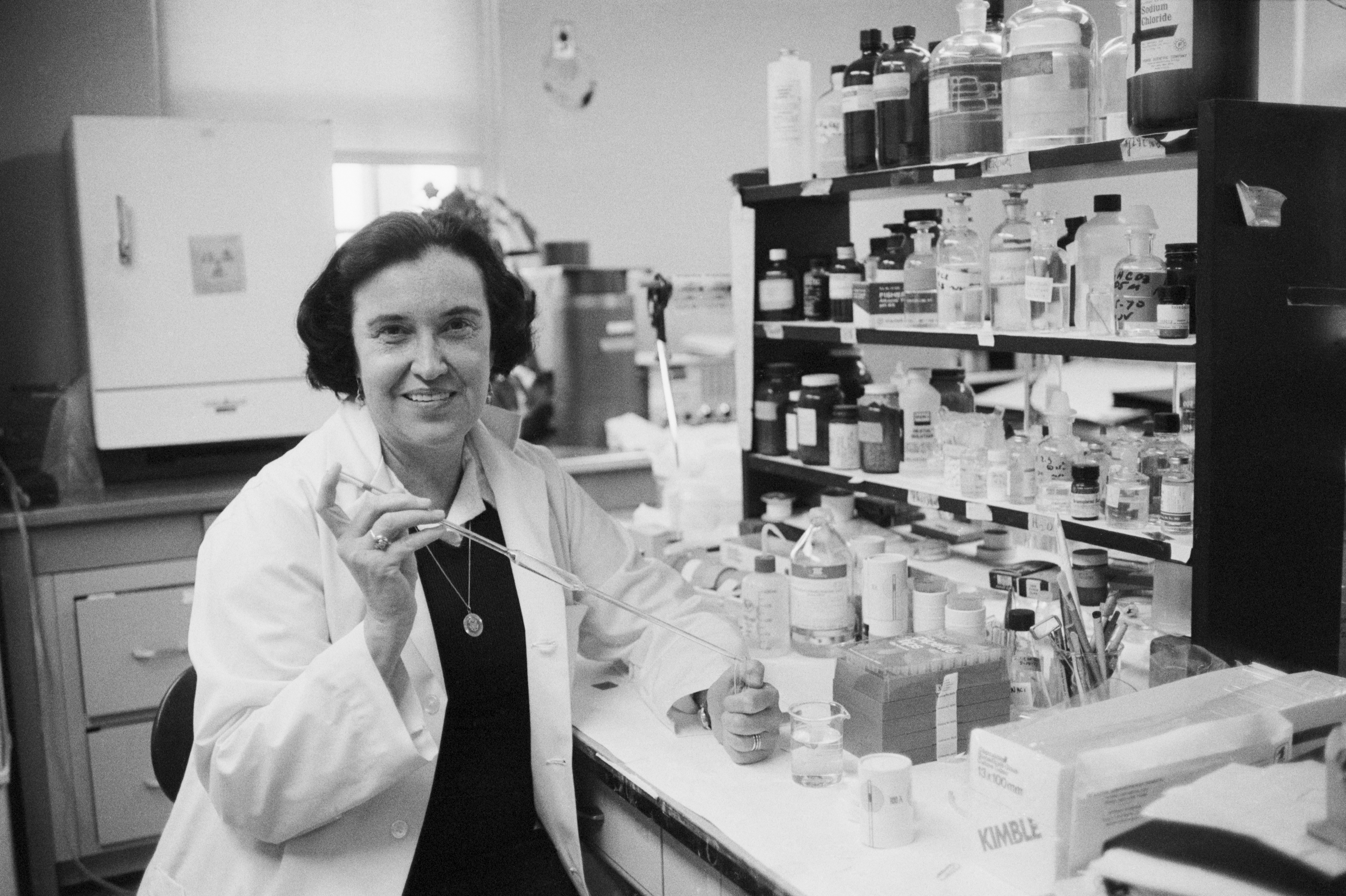
Rosalyn S. Yalow

- Frances Allen (1932–2020), American computer scientist and pioneer in the field of optimizing compilers (see also Frances Allen's Oral History Interview)
- Carol Bartz (born 1948), former president and CEO of Yahoo!, former chairman, president and CEO at Autodesk
- The ENIAC Programmers: The original six women programmers of ENIAC (Electronic Numerical Integrator And Computer), first general-purpose electronic digital computer
  - Kathleen Antonelli (1921–2006)
  - Jean Jennings Bartik (1924–2011)
  - Frances Snyder Holberton (1917–2001)
  - Marlyn Wescoff Meltzer (1922–2008)
  - Frances Bilas Spence (1922–2012)
  - Ruth Lichterman Teitelbaum (1924–1986)
- Pamela Meyer Lopker, founder, president and chairman of the board, QAD Inc., an Enterprise resource planning / manufacturing software company
- Marcia Neugebauer (born 1932), American geophysicist whose research yielded first direct measurements of solar wind and shed light on its physics and interaction with comet
- Donna Shirley (born 1941), former manager of Mars Exploration at the NASA Jet Propulsion Laboratory (see also Donna Shirley Oral History Interview at NASA Oral History Project: "Herstory", Donna Shirley Interviews, Mars Exploration Program)
- Shaunna Sowell, former vice president and manager of Worldwide semiconductor Facilities, Texas Instruments
- Patty Stonesifer (born 1956), former co-chair and chief executive officer of Bill and Melinda Gates Foundation, current president and CEO of Martha's Table
- Patricia Wallington, former corporate vice president and CIO, Xerox Corporation
- Rosalyn S. Yalow (1921–2011), American medical physicist, and co-winner of 1977 Nobel Prize in Physiology or Medicine (together with Roger Guillemin and Andrew Schally) for development of the radioimmunoassay (RIA) technique. She was the second American woman to be awarded the Nobel Prize Physiology or Medicine after Gerty Cori

=== 1998 ===
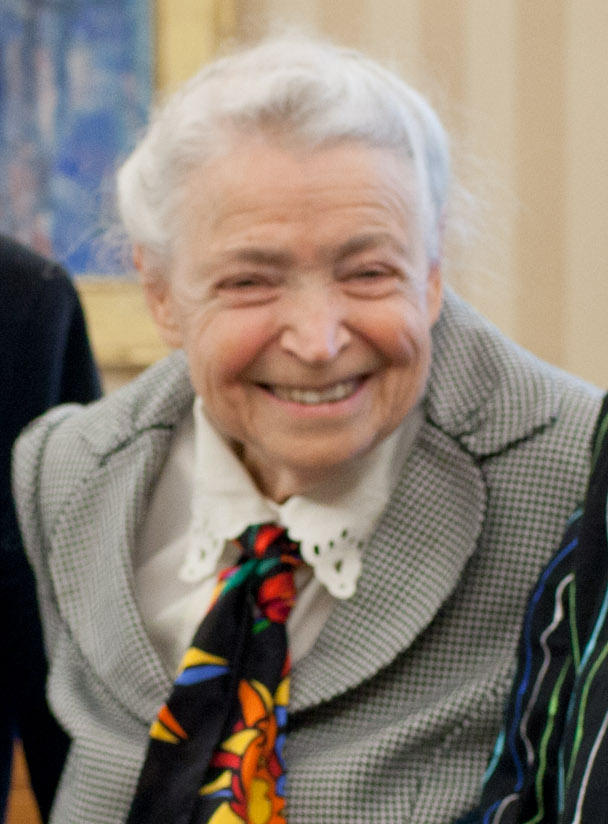
Mildred Dresselhaus

- Dr. Anita Borg (1949–2003), American computer scientist who founded the Institute for Women and Technology (now the Anita Borg Institute for Women and Technology) and the Grace Hopper Celebration of Women in Computing
- Mildred Spiewak Dresselhaus (1930–2017), Institute Professor and Professor of Physics and Electrical Engineering (Emeritus) in the area of condensed matter physics at Massachusetts Institute of Technology. (see also Vegas Science Trust video interviews with scientists: Mildred Dresselhaus)
- Dr. Gertrude B. Elion (1918–1999), American biochemist and pharmacologist; 1988 recipient of Nobel Prize in Physiology or Medicine. Research led to the development of AIDS drug AZT
- Julie Spicer England (born 1957) former vice president, Texas Instruments, Incorporated General Manager, RFid Systems
- Eleanor Francis Helin (1932–2009), American astronomer who was principal investigator of Near-Earth Asteroid Tracking (NEAT) program of NASA's Jet Propulsion Laboratory

=== 1999 ===
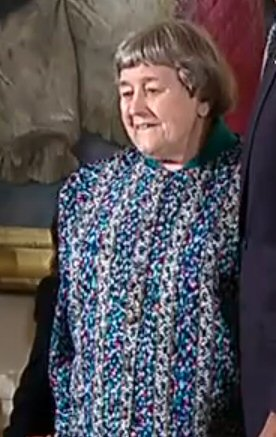
Yvonne Brill

- Yvonne Claeys Brill (1924–2013), Canadian scientist known for development of rocket and jet propulsion technologies at NASA and the International Maritime Satellite Organization. (see also National Science & Technology Medals Foundation video)
- Sherita T. Ceasar, Vice President Product Engineering Planning and Strategy, Comcast Communications
- Dr. Thelma Estrin (1924–2014), computer scientist and engineer who pioneered work in expert systems and biomedical engineering. She was one of the first to apply computer technology to healthcare and medical research
- Dr. Claudine Simson, former executive vice president, chief technology officer, LSI Corporation; current Director & Business Development Executive, Research and IP, Worldwide Growth Markets, IBM Corporation
- Yukako Uchinaga (born 1947), vice president, IBM's Yamato Software Development Laboratory (see also Yukako Uchinaga's Oral History Interview)

=== 2000 ===
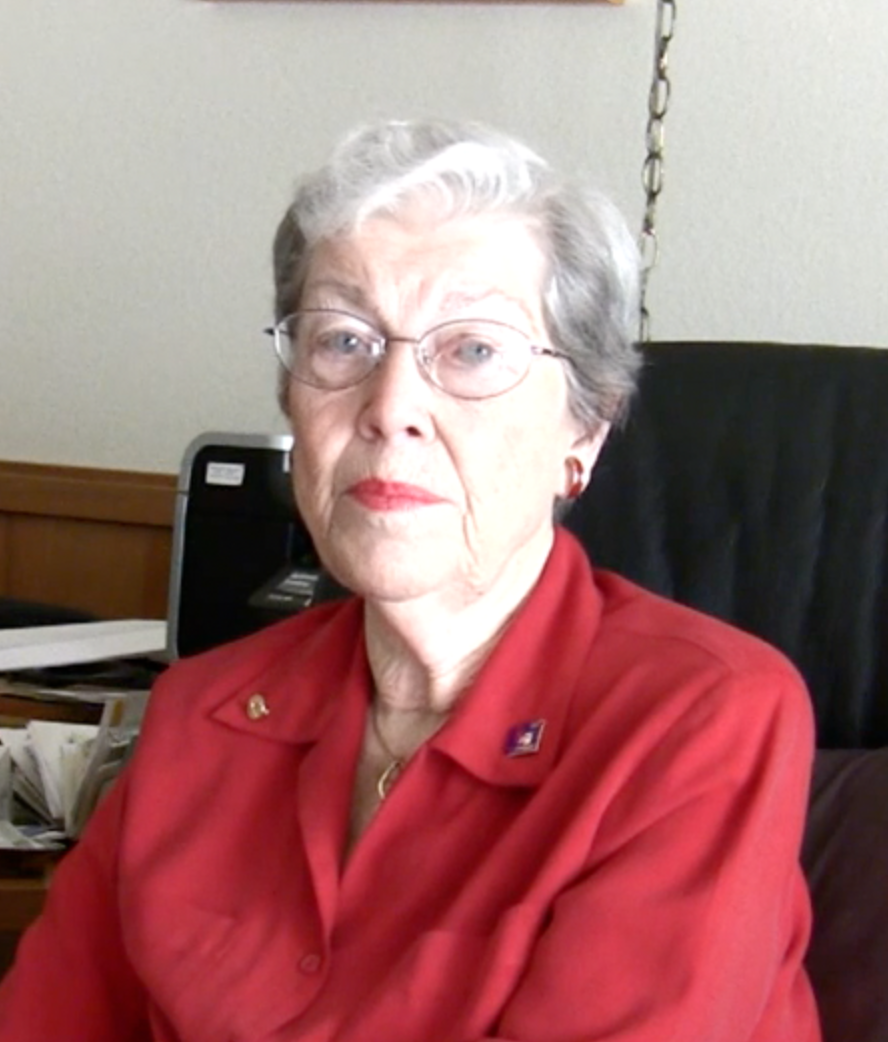
Darleane C. Hoffman

- Dr. Bonnie Dunbar (1949–), former NASA astronaut; former president and CEO of The Museum of Flight. Leads the University of Houston's STEM Center (science, technology, engineering and math) and joined the faculty of the Cullen College of Engineering. (see also Q&A with Dr. Bonnie Dunbar, University of Houston Cullen College of Engineering)
- Dr. Irene Greif, founder of field of Computer-Supported Cooperative Work (CSCW). IBM Fellow; director, Collaborative User Experience research and IBM Center for Social Business.
- Dr. Darleane C. Hoffman (1926–2025), American nuclear chemist among researchers who confirmed existence of Seaborgium, element 106
- Dr. Jennie S. Hwang, first woman to receive Ph.D. from Case Western Reserve University's Materials Science and Engineering; expert in surface-mount technology
- Dr. Shirley Ann Jackson (1946–), president of Rensselaer Polytechnic Institute. American physicist. First African-American to serve as chairman of U.S. Nuclear Regulatory Commission, elected to U.S. National Academy of Engineering, and to receive Vannevar Bush Award. She is first African-American woman to lead a top-50 national research university

=== 2001 ===
- Duy-Loan Le (born 1962), Vietnamese American engineer and first woman and Asian to be elected to rank of Texas Instruments Senior Fellow
- Janet Perna, former general manager of information management solutions at [IBM] specializing in distributed database systems / IBM DB2
- Darlene Solomon (born 1959), senior vice president, chief technology officer, Agilent Technologies specializing in Bio-analytical and electronic measurement

=== 2002 ===
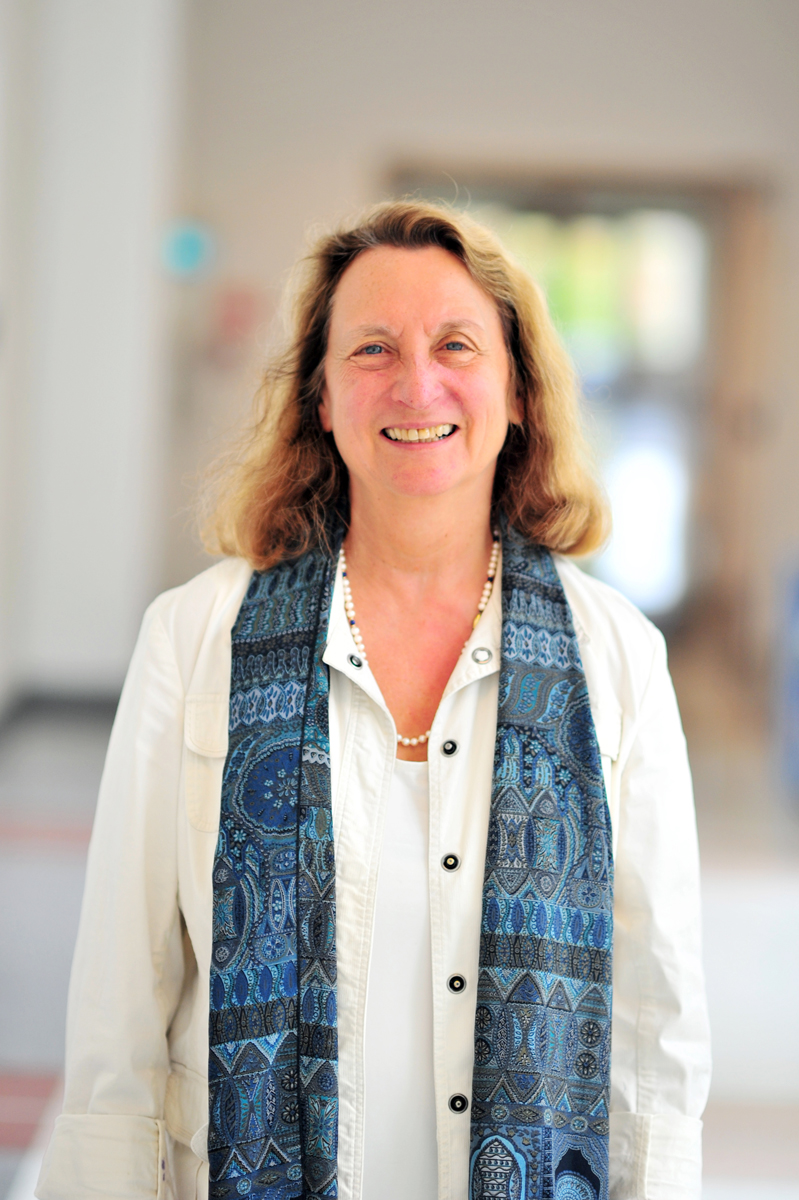
Elaine Oran

- Judy Estrin (born 1954 or 1955), American business executive, JLabs, LLC. Former chief technology officer for Cisco Systems
- Dr. Caroline Kovac, former general manager, IBM Healthcare and Life Sciences (see also Caroline Kovac's oral history)
- Dr. Elaine Surick Oran (born 1946), senior scientist, Reactive Flow Physics, U.S. Naval Research Lab, Laboratory for Computational Physics and Fluid Dynamics

=== 2003 ===
- Chieko Asakawa (born 1958), IBM Fellow. Group Leader, IBM Tokyo Research Laboratory, Accessibility Research; developed IBM Home Page Reader, a self-voicing web browser designed for people who are blind (see also Japanese Wikipedia entry)
- Wanda Gass, Texas Instruments Fellow; executive director and founder, High-Tech High Heels ("HTHH"), a donor-advised fund at Dallas Women's Foundation that funds programs to prepare girls to pursue degrees in Science, Technology, Engineering and Math (STEM) (see also Wanda Gass oral history)
- Dr. Kristina M. Johnson (born 1957), American former government official, academic, engineer, and business executive
- Shirley C. McCarty, aerospace consultant

=== 2004 ===
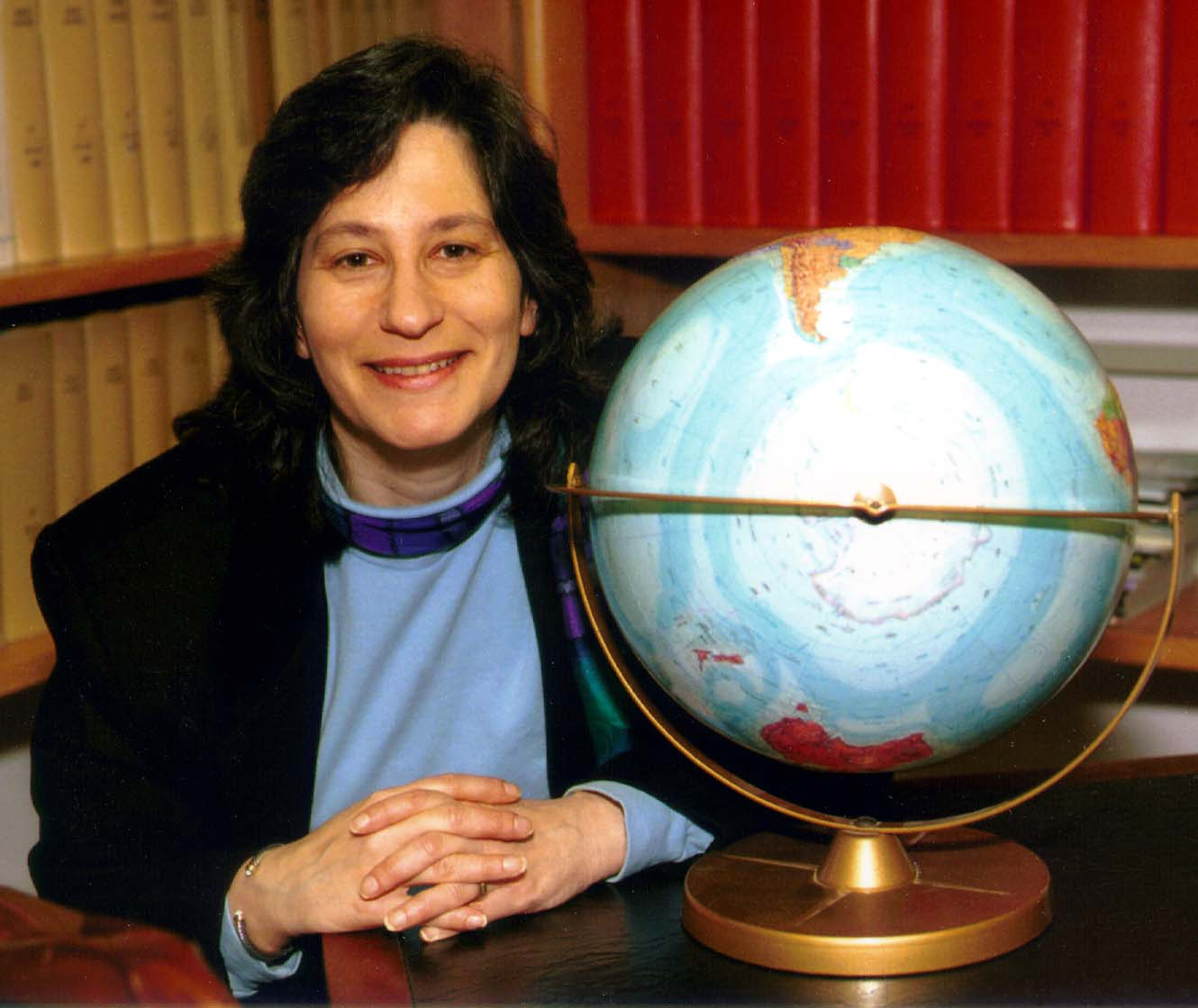
Susan Solomon

- Dr. Mary-Dell Chilton, Ph.D. (born 1939), founder of modern plant biotechnology and genetic modification; known as the "queen of Agrobacterium"
- Eileen Gail de Planque, Ph.D. (1944–2010), expert on environmental radiation measurements; first woman and first health physicist to become a Nuclear Regulatory Commission Commissioner; technical areas of expertise include solid state dosimetry, radiation transport and shielding, environmental radiation, nuclear facilities monitoring and problems of reactor and personnel dosimetry
- Dr. Pat Selinger, IBM Fellow; American computer scientist best known for her work on relational database management systems (see also Patricia Selinger oral history)
- Judy Shaw, director, CMOS Module Development at Texas Instruments
- Dr. Susan Solomon (1956–2010), atmospheric chemist; first to propose chlorofluorocarbon free radical reaction mechanism as cause of Antarctic ozone hole

=== 2005 ===
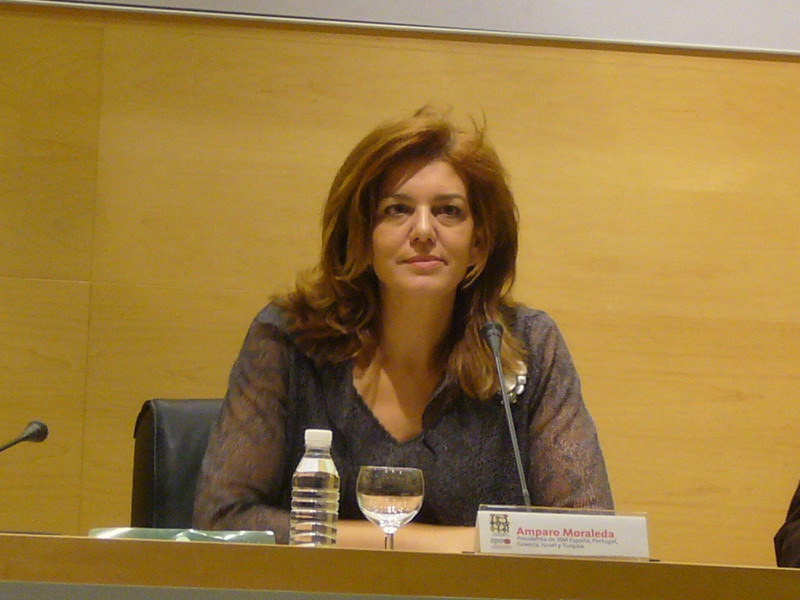
Amparo Moraleda Martínez

- Barbara Bauer, technology innovation, software development, global management
- Sonja Bernhardt OAM (born 1959), Australian information technology executive; founder and Inaugural President of WiT (Women in Technology) in Queensland
- Sandra Burke Ph.D., cardiovascular physiologist, former pre-clinical cardiovascular researcher at Abbott Vascular's Research and Advanced Development; developed drug-coated stent intravascular stents for treatment of restenosis
- Melendy Lovett (born c. 1959), senior vice president of Texas Instruments; president of Texas Instruments's worldwide Education Technology business; STEM education and workforce advocate, High-Tech High Heels (HTHH)
- Amparo Moraleda Martínez (born 1964), former COO Iberdrola International Division; former president for Southern Europe, IBM (see also Spanish language Wikipedia entry)
- Neerja Raman, global manufacturing and poverty. Senior Research Fellow, Stanford University; advisor, Committee for Cyber-Infrastructure, National Science Foundation; formerly HP Labs

=== 2006 ===
- Maria Azua, former IBM Vice President of Advanced Cloud Solutions, former IBM VP of Technology & Innovation; patent in Transcoder technology, Java implementation and enhancements, data manipulation
- Françoise Barré-Sinoussi (born 1947) French virologist; director of Regulation of Retroviral Infections Division (Unité de Régulation des Infections Rétrovirales) at Institut Pasteur. Nobel Prize in Physiology or Medicine (2008) for discovery of virus responsible for HIV
- Kim Jones (born 1956 or 1957), former president and managing director for Sun Microsystems UK & Ireland; former VP of Global Education, Government and Health Sciences, Sun Microsystems; chairman of the board and chief executive officer of Curriki
- Nor Rae Spohn, former SVP Hewlett-Packard LaserJet Printing Business
- Dr. Been-Jon Woo, director, Technology Integration & Development, Intel

=== 2007 ===
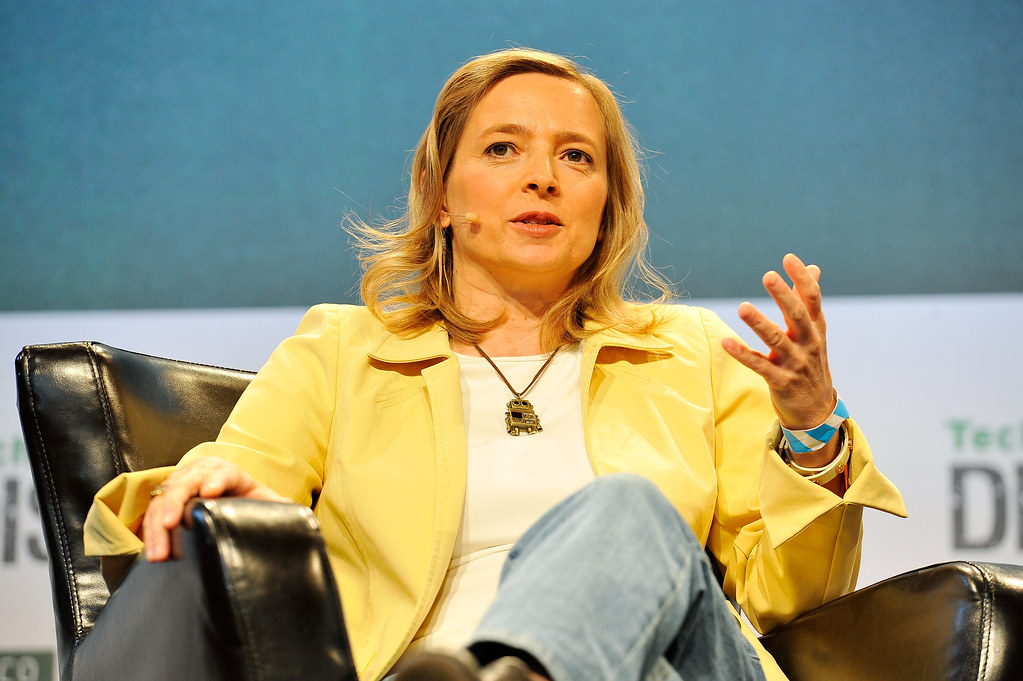
Helen Greiner

- Dr. Wanda M. Austin (born 1954), first African American President and CEO, The Aerospace Corporation
- Helen Greiner (born 1967), co-founder of iRobot; CEO of CyPhyWorks, maker of the hover drone. Director of the board, Open Source Robotics Foundation (see also National Center for Women & Information Technology (NCWIT), Interview with Helen Greiner)
- Lucy Sanders (born 1954), CEO and co-founder of National Center for Women & Information Technology (NCWIT); Executive-in-Residence for ATLAS Institute at University of Colorado at Boulder
- Padmasree Warrior, chief technology and strategy officer of Cisco Systems; former CTO of Motorola, Inc.

=== 2008 ===
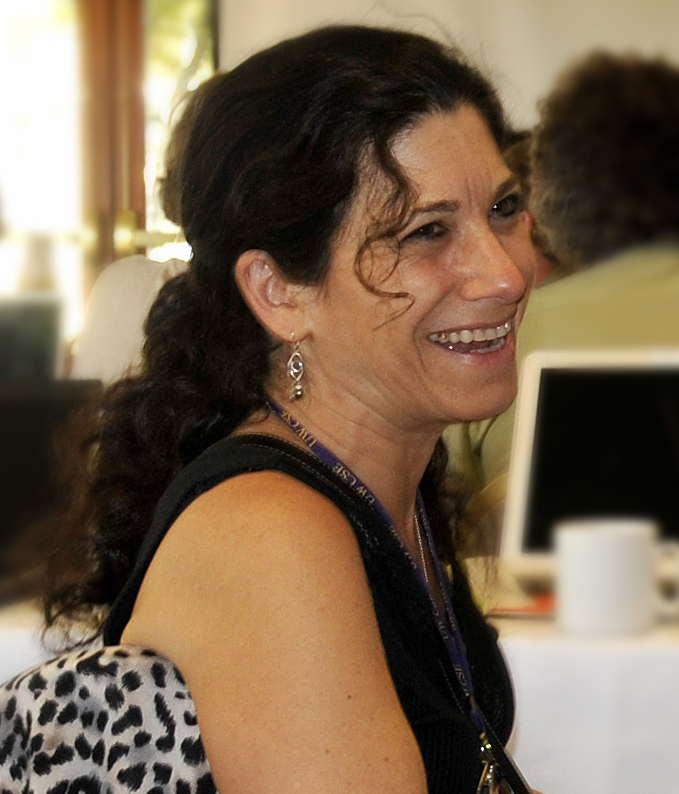
Deborah Estrin

- Deborah Estrin (born 1959), Ph.D., works in networked sensors. First academic faculty member at Cornell Tech; founding director, Center for Embedded Networked Sensing, UCLA. Winner of a 2018 MacArthur Fellowship.
- Dr. Susan P. Fisher-Hoch (born 1940), expert on infectious diseases; professor of epidemiology, The University of Texas Health Science Center School of Public Health
- Mary Lou Jepsen (born 1965), head of Display Division at Google X Lab; founder of Pixel Qi, a manufacturer of low-cost, low-power LCD screens for laptops; co-founder and first Chief Technology Officer One Laptop per Child (OLPC) (see also TED talk)
- Gordana Vunjak-Novakovic, Serbian American professor of biomedical engineering, Columbia University; director, Columbia's Laboratory for Stem Cells and Tissue Engineering. Areas of research: tissue engineering, bioreactors, biophysical regulation, tissue development, stem cell research.
- Jian (Jane) Xu, Ph.D., CTO, IBM China Systems and Technology Labs; Distinguished Engineer of IBM Watson Research, focusing on the research of IT and Wireless Convergence

=== 2009 ===
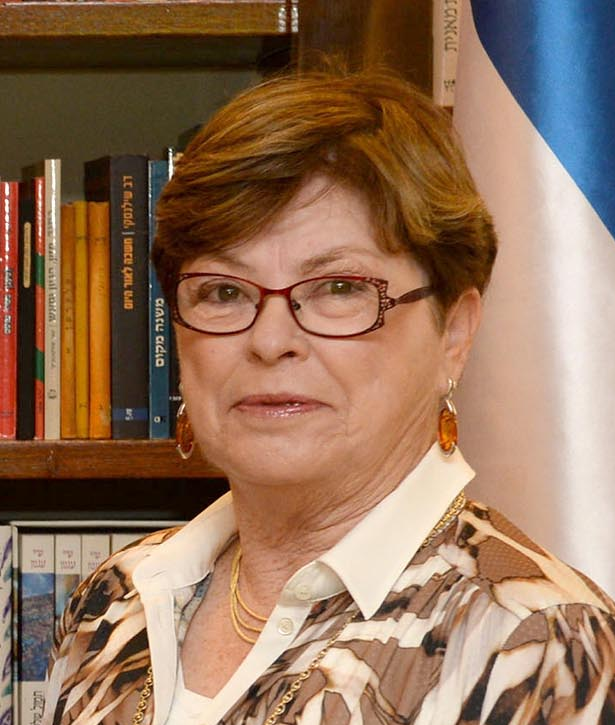
Maxine Fassberg

- Patricia S. Cowings (born 1948), first African-American female scientist to be trained as an astronaut payload specialist; Research Psychologist, Human Systems Integrations Division, NASA Ames Research Center
- Maxine Fassberg (born c. 1953), vice president, Technology and Manufacturing Group, Fab 28 Plant manager; general manager, Intel Israel
- Dr. Sharon Nunes, VP, IBM's Smarter Cities Strategy & Solutions, which focuses on improving quality of life at urban centers worldwide by partnering with city governments to improve transportation, waste management and energy use
- Dr. Carolyn Turbyfill, VP Engineering, Stacksafe

=== 2010 ===
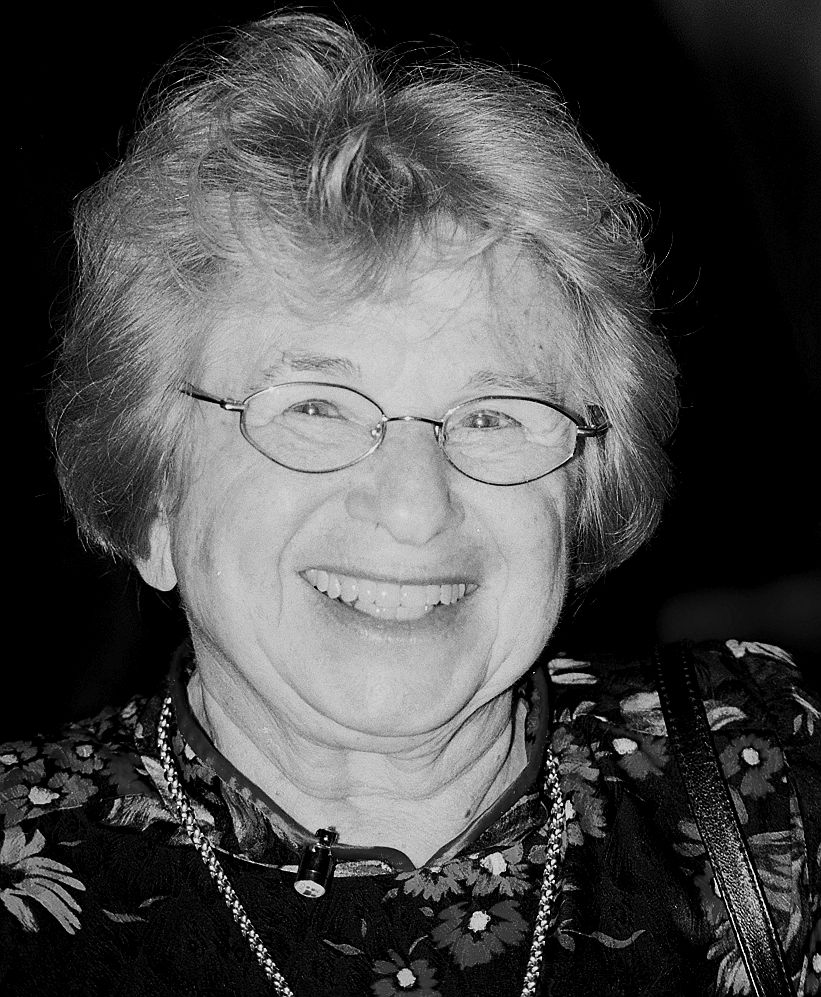
Dr. Ruth Westheimer

- Sandy Carter, IBM's worldwide VP, Social Business Evangelism and Sales, IBM’s Social Business initiative
- Dr. Ruth A. David (born 1953), president and CEO, ANSER (Analytic Services Inc); Member, Homeland Security Advisory Council; former deputy director for Science and Technology, CIA.
- Adele Goldberg (born 1945), computer scientist; participated in developing programming language Smalltalk-80 and various concepts related to object-oriented programming while a researcher at Xerox Palo Alto Research Center (PARC), in the 1970s, then founding chairman, ParcPlace Systems, Inc.
- Susie Wee (born c. 1970), CTO, Cisco Systems; former CTO, Client Cloud Services, HP Labs. Focus on streaming media; co-edited JPSEC standard for JPEG-2000 image security (see also TED TEDxBayArea Women talk)
- Dr. Ruth Westheimer (born Karola Siegel (1928–2024); known as "Dr. Ruth"), German-American sex therapist, talk show host, author, professor, Holocaust survivor, and former Haganah sniper.

=== 2011 ===
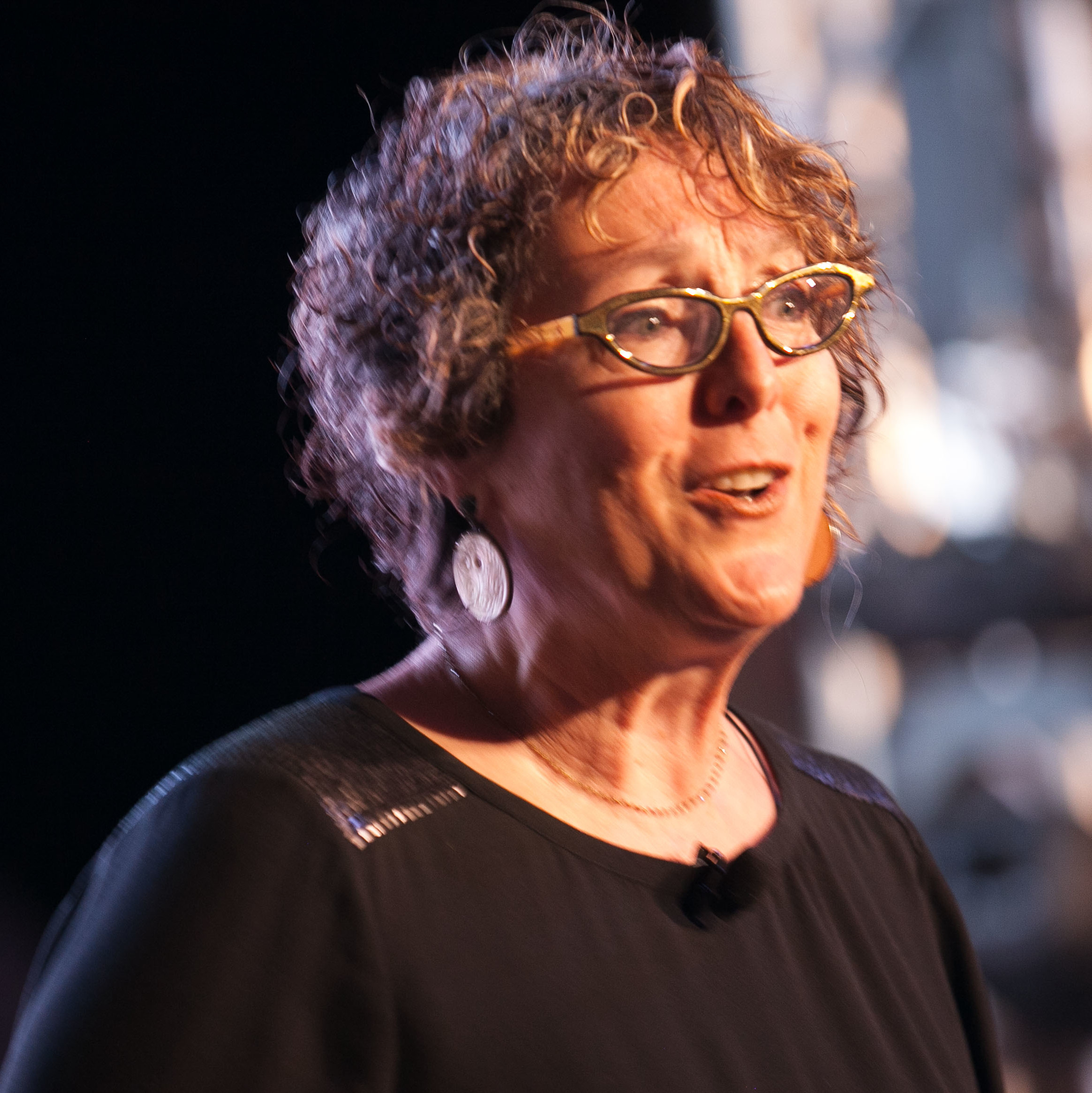
Lynda Weinman

- Alicia Abella, Ph.D., executive director, Innovative Services Research, AT&T Labs; Member, President's Advisory Commission on Educational Excellence for Hispanics
- Evelyn Berezin (1925–2018), American computer engineer best known for designing one of the first word processors. She also helped design some of the first computer reservations systems, computer data systems for banks; Management Consultant, Brookhaven Science Associates (BSA) (BSA manages Brookhaven National Laboratory for Department of Energy's Office of Science)
- Diane Pozefsky, Ph.D., research professor, Department of Computer Science, University of North Carolina; specialized in networking technologies at IBM (see also IBM Diane Pozefsky oral history)
- Sophie Vandebroek, Ph.D., CTO and president, Xerox Innovation Group, Xerox Corporation
- Lynda Weinman (born 1955), co-founder and executive chair, Lynda.com, an online software training web site

=== 2012 ===
- Genevieve Bell, Ph.D., Australian anthropologist and researcher. Intel Fellow; director, User Interaction and Experience, Intel Labs, Intel Corporation
- Joanne Martin, Ph.D. (born 1947). Served on management team that developed and delivered IBM's first supercomputer, with specific responsibility for the performance measurement and analysis of the system. Distinguished Engineer and VP of Technology, IBM Corporation
- Jane Lubchenco (born 1947), Ph.D. Ukrainian-American environmental scientist and marine ecologist; first woman administrator of National Oceanic and Atmospheric Administration (NOAA); (see also Charlie Rose interview); Haas Distinguished Visitor, Stanford University
- Gwynne Shotwell (born 1963), president, SpaceX (see also Shotwell: The Future of Space talk at Northwestern)

=== 2013 ===
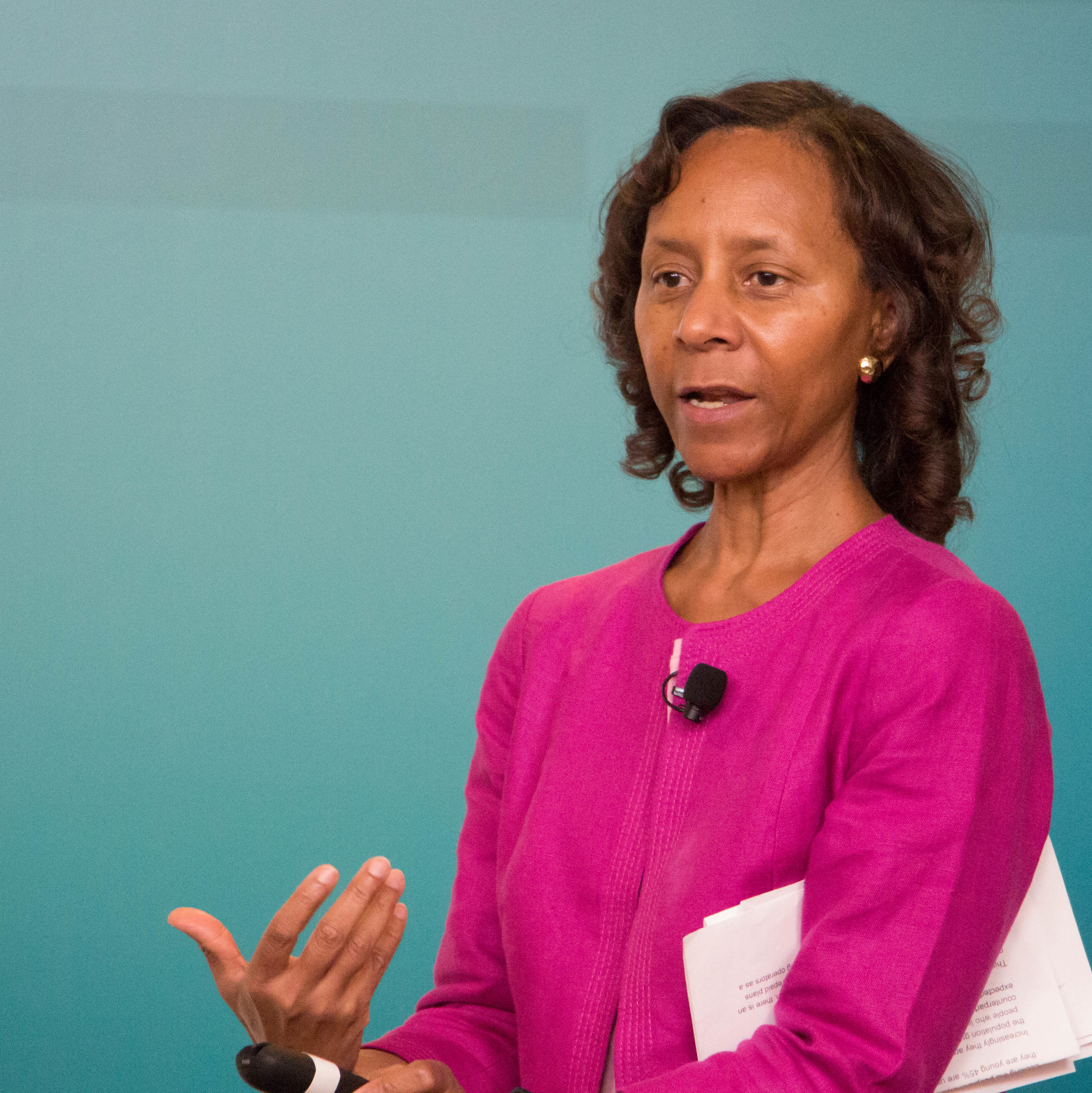
Marian Croak

- Marian Croak (born 1955), senior vice president of applications and services infrastructure at AT&T Labs
- Peggy Johnson (born 1960 or 1961), executive vice president of Qualcomm Technologies and president of Global Market Development
- Lisa McVey, CIO of Enterprise Information Systems, Enterprise Medical Imaging, Automation, McKesson Corporation
- Heidi Roizen (born 1958), Venture Partner of Draper Fisher Jurvetson
- Laura Sanders, general manager of delivery engineering and technology and CTO for Global Technology Services, IBM Corporation

=== 2014 ===
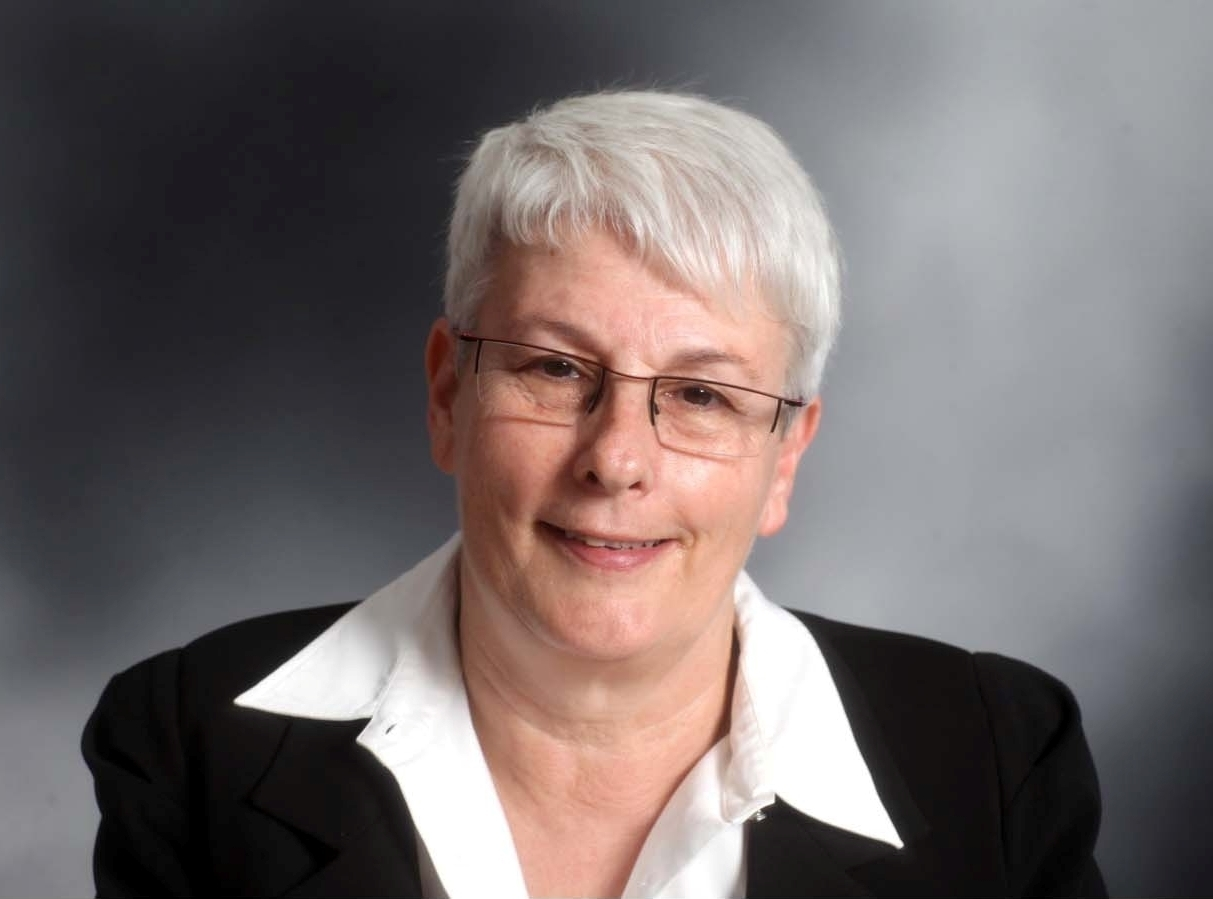
Orna Berry

- Orna Berry (born 1949), Israeli corporate vice president, growth and innovation, EMC Centers of Excellence EMEA, EMC Corporation
- Jennifer Pahlka (born 1969), founder and executive director, Code for America
- Kim Polese (born 1961), chair, ClearStreet
- Kris Rinne, senior vice president, network and product planning, AT&T Services, Inc.
- Lauren States (born 1956), vice president, strategy and transformation, IBM Software Group

=== 2015 ===
- Cheemin Bo-Linn, president and CEO, Peritus Partners
- Nichelle Nichols (1932–2022), American actress
- Pam Parisian, chief information officer, AT&T
- Sheryl Root, president and CEO, RootAnalysis
- Marie Wieck, general manager, Middleware, IBM

=== 2016 ===
- Kimberly Bryant (born 1967), Founder and executive director, Black Girls Code
- Roberta Banaszak Gleiter CEO, Global Institute For Technology & Engineering
- Harriet Green OBE (born 1961), general manager, IBM
- Jennifer Yates, Ph.D., assistant vice president, AT&T
- Ellie Yieh, corporate vice president, Applied Materials

=== 2017 ===
- Beena Ammanath, Global Vice President, Hewlett Packard Enterprise
- Laura Niklason, Founder, Humacyte
- Krunali Patel Vice President, Texas Instruments
- Lisa Seacat DeLuca, Strategist, IBM
- Selma Svendsen Senior Director, iRobot
- Elizabeth Xu, chief technology officer, BMC Software

=== 2018 ===
- Rhonda Childress, IBM Fellow VP – GTS Data Security and Privacy Officer, IBM
- Elizabeth "Jake" Feinler (born 1931), Internet Pioneer
- Roz Ho, Senior VP and GM, Consumer & Metadata, TiVo
- Santosh K. Kurinec, Rochester Institute of Technology, professor of electrical and microelectronic engineering
- Yanbing Li, Ph.D., Sr VP and general manager, Storage and Availability Business Uni, VMware
- Rashmi Rao, Global Head, Advanced Engineering, CoC User Experience, Harman

=== 2019 ===
- Heather Hinton, vice president and IBM Distinguished Engineer, IBM.
- Julia Liuson (born 1970), corporate vice president, Developer Tools, Microsoft.
- Dr. Sara Rushinek, professor of business technology and health informatics, University of Miami.
- Dr. Natalia Trayanova, professor of biomedical engineering and medicine, Johns Hopkins University
- Blanca Treviño, president and CEO, Softtek

=== 2021 ===
- Arundhati Bhattacharya (born 1956), chairperson and chief executive officer for the State Bank of India
- Lisa P. Jackson (born 1962), EPA Administrator
- Olu Maduka (born 1941), Founding Board Member and current Chairman of the Board of Women in Energy, Oil, and Gas Nigeria (WEOG)
- Karen Quintos, senior vice president and chief marketing officer – Dell Inc.
- Angie Ruan, vice president of engineering at Chime
- Lisa T. Su, Ph.D (born 1969), president and CEO, Advanced Micro Devices
- Kara Swisher (born 1962), editor-at-large of New York Media
- Tae Yoo, senior vice president, corporate affairs and corporate social responsibility, Cisco
