= Duy-Loan Le =

Vietnamese engineer (born 1962)

Duy-Loan T. Le
- Born: 1962 (age 63–64); Nha Trang, South Vietnam
- Citizenship: USA
- Education: BSEE, magna cum laude, University of Texas at Austin (1982); MBA, University of Houston (May 1989)
- Alma mater: The University of Texas at Austin and The University of Houston
- Occupations: Engineer & Engineering Manager
- Employer: Texas Instruments
- Known for: Engineering and the being the first woman and Asian elected to the rank of Texas Instruments Senior Fellow. Charity work and philanthropy (including the Sunflower Mission and Mona Foundation)
- Notable work: 24 patents and co-designing the fastest Digital signal processor (DSP) chip (2004 Guinness World Records)
- Board member of: Mona Foundation; Science National Honor Society; Asian & Pacific Islander American Scholarship Fund (APIASF); National Instruments Corporation
- Spouse: Tuan N. Dao
- Children: two sons, Dan Dao and Don Dao
- Awards: Top 20 Houston Women in Technology in 2000; Women in Technology Hall of Fame in 2001; Asian American Engineer of the year; 2007 Anita Borg Institute Women of Vision Award for Leadership; Congressional Special Recognition for Civil Leadership

Duy-Loan T. Le (born 1962) is an engineer and the first woman and Asian elected as a Texas Instruments Senior Fellow.

== Early life ==
Le was born on July 17, 1962 in Nha Trang, South Vietnam. She left Vietnam in 1975, traveling with her mother and six of her siblings. The family moved to Houston where she started school having been placed into sixth grade. While she did not know English when she first moved to Houston, she studied the langauage and graduated from Alief Hastings High School at 16 as valedictorian of her class.

== Education ==
Le graduated from the University of Texas at Austin magna cum laude in 1982 when she was 19 years old. In 1989 she received her MBA from the University of Houston while working full-time.

== Career ==
Le started working at Texas Instruments after she graduated from college, her first position was as a memory design engineer.

She was elected to the Technical Staff in 1990, and by 1993 she was a Senior Member of Technical Staff. In 1997 Le was elected as distinguished member of the Technical Staff. In 1998 she became the first women at Texas Instruments to be named a fellow, along with fellow engineer Wanda Gass. As of 2005, she was one of six people who have been named as a senior fellow at Texas Instruments.

Her later work at Texas Instruments centered on digital signal processing. Through her work at Texas Instruments she has filed 24 patents.

== Philanthropy ==
Le has worked to advance education and learning conditions in Vietnam. Le was a founding member of Sunflower Mission, which helps with educational settings in Vietnam. She also serves as director for the Mona Foundation, a group that focuses on education.

== Honors and awards ==
In 1976, she received her first recognition in the US as 'Citizen of the Month' from Kiwanis International Club.

In 1981, The Houston Chronicle featured her as 'Scholastic Wonder'; she also received commendation from The Office of The Ambassador of The Royal Netherlands for her scholastic achievement and her humanitarian effort in fund raising to aid the Vietnamese refugees.

In 2002 she was named National Technologist of the Year at the Women of Color Conference. She received the Anita Borg Institute Women of Vision Award for Leadership in 2007.

In 2001 she was named to Women in Technology International's International Hall of Fame, and in 2017 she was named to the Asian Hall of Fame.

== Personal life ==
Duy-Loan Le is married to Tuan N. Dao. They have two sons, Dan Dao and Don Dao.
