= Yukako =

- Gender: Female

Origin
- Origin: Japanese
- Meaning: Different meanings depending on the kanji used

Yukako (written: 友佳子 or ゆか子) is a feminine Japanese given name. Notable people with the name include:

- Yukako Uchinaga (内永 ゆか子; born 1947), Japanese businesswoman
- Yukako Yoshikawa (吉川 友佳子), better known as Anri Shiono, Japanese voice actress
- Yukako Kawai (川井 友香子; born 1997), Japanese freestyle wrestler
