= Susie Wee =

American technology expert

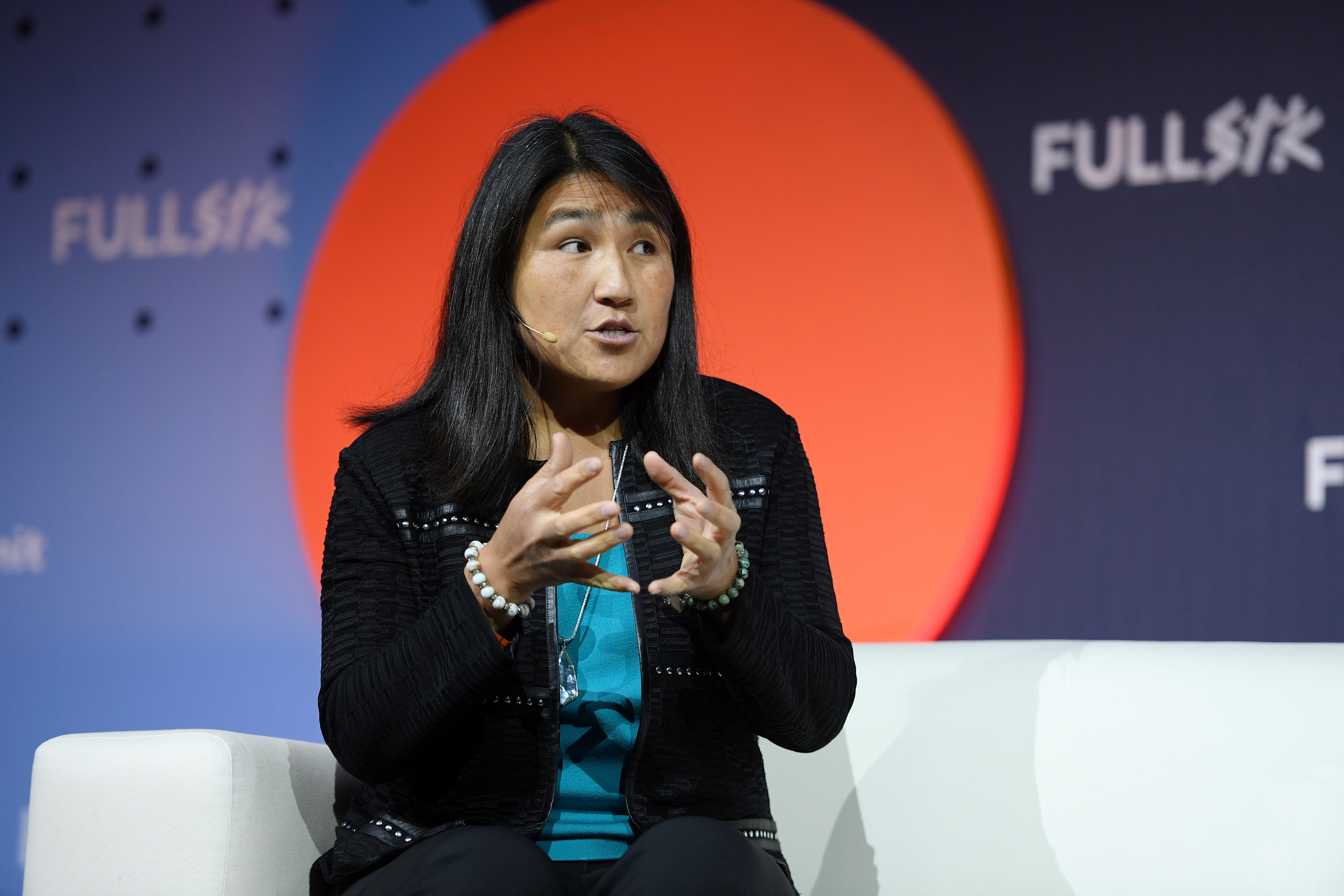
Wee in 2018

Susie J. Wee (born ca. 1970) is an American technology expert. In 2011, she became the Vice President and Chief Technology and Experience Officer (CTEO) of Collaboration at Cisco Systems. In 2018, she became the Senior Vice President and Chief Technology Officer of Cisco DevNet, which she founded in 2014. Wee is a WITI Hall of Fame inductee.

== Biography ==
Susie J. Wee was born in Batavia, New York, and completed her studies in electrical engineering at the Massachusetts Institute of Technology (B.S., 1990; S.M., 1991; Ph.D., 1996), Wee joined Hewlett-Packard in 1996 as a researcher and worked there for 15 years, including serving as the CTO of Client Cloud Services. She joined Cisco Systems in April 2011 as its CTEO of Collaboration. Wee was the co-editor of the JPSEC standard and the JPSEC amendment. She also served as an associate editor for the IEEE Transactions on Circuits, Systems and Video Technology as well as the IEEE Transactions on Image Processing. Cisco DevNet, Cisco's community for developers, was launched in 2014 under Wee's leadership.

== Awards ==
- 2002, Innovator Under 35, MIT Technology Review
- 2007, "40 Under 40" IT innovators, Computerworld
- 2010, Women in Technology International Hall of Fame inductee
