= Shaunna Sowell =

American engineer

- Known for: Former Vice President & Manager of Worldwide Semiconductor Facilities, Texas Instruments
- Scientific career
- Fields: Engineering

Shaunna F. Sowell is an engineer who was Vice President and Manager of DFAB water fabrication facilities for Texas Instruments.

== Education ==
Sowell was awarded a Bachelor of Science in mechanical engineering from New Mexico State University. She also received a Bachelor of Science in education from the University of Texas at Austin.

== Career ==
In 1985, Sowell began work as a project engineer for Texas Instruments, in the defense division. She went on to support water fabrication construction in 1987 before becoming the manager for Worldwide Environmental Safety and Health in 1994.

In 1998, Sowell was promoted to Manager of Worldwide Semiconductor Facilities, heading the construction chain for semiconductors in the company across the globe. In 2000, she became the first woman to manage the DFAB facilities. She spearheaded efforts to improve environmental and safety consciousness.

== Personal life ==
Sowell resides in Richardson, Texas and has three children.

== Awards ==
Sowell was inducted into Women in Technology International's Women in Science and Technology Hall of Fame in 1997.
