= Jian Xu =

Software engineer from China

- Education: PhD in Computer Science
- Alma mater: University of Hawaii, University of Southern California
- Occupation: Software Engineer

Jian (Jane) Xu is a software engineer from China. She has served as engineer at IBM and as the chief technology officer (CTO) of China Systems and Technology Labs at IBM.

== Biography ==
Xu was born in Hong Kong and was raised in Shanghai. She left Shanghai to pursue her education in the United States in 1982 and saw how computers were impacting the lives of people. Xu attended the University of Hawaii at Manoa, where she graduated with a masters in computer science in 1986. She attended the University of Southern California and received her PhD in computer science in 1990.

Shortly after earning her doctorate, she joined the IBM Storage Systems Division and then went on to become a technical leader for the IBM Software Group from 1995 to 2000. She was an executive assistant at the IBM Almaden Research Center in 2001 and then went on to working at the IBM Systems and Technology Group in 2002. Her work at IBM Systems and Technology development in China involves developing new ways to manage energy use, "environmental improvement and multicore technology." Xu was elected to the IBM Academy and has held the highest non-executive position an engineer can hold at the company. Xu has contributed to several "IBM innovations" while working for the company, including the Digital Library, Net.Data, DB2 XML enablement, Information Lifecycle Management, grid storage and autonomic storage management.

In 2008, she was inducted into the Women in Technology Hall of Fame. She has also received three IBM Outstanding Technical Achievement Awards and holds 15 US patents on her work.
