= Chieko Asakawa =

Japanese computer scientist

- 浅川 智恵子
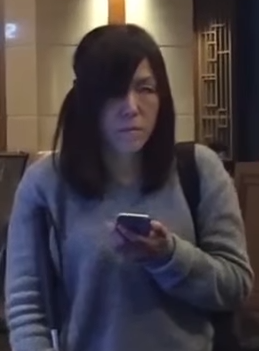
- Chieko Asakawa during a field experiment in Nihonbashi, Tokyo in 2017
- Born: Osaka, Japan
- Education: University of Tokyo (Ph.D.)
- Awards: National Academy of Engineering (2017); Women in Technology International Hall of Fame; National Inventors Hall of Fame; IBM Fellow (2009); Anita Borg Institute Women of Vision Award; Japanese Medal of Honor
- Scientific career
- Fields: Computer science, Accessibility

Chieko Asakawa (浅川 智恵子, Asakawa Chieko) is a blind Japanese computer scientist, known for her work at IBM Research – Tokyo in accessibility. A Netscape browser plug-in she developed, the IBM Home Page Reader, became the most widely used web-to-speech system available. She is the recipient of numerous industry and government awards.

== Education and career ==
Asakawa was born with normal sight. When she was eleven years old, while swimming, she struck her left eye on the side of the pool, injuring her optic nerve. She began losing her sight, and by the age of fourteen was completely blind. She earned a bachelor's degree in English literature at Otemon Gakuin University in Osaka in 1982, followed by a two-year computer programming course designed for the visually impaired; students used Optacons to translate print to tactile sensation. She joined IBM Research in a temporary position in 1984, and became a permanent staff researcher one year later. In 2004 she earned a Ph.D. in engineering from the University of Tokyo.

== Contributions ==
Asakawa's research projects have included developing a word processor for Braille documents, developing a digital library for Braille documents, developing an application to improve accessibility of streaming services, developing a Netscape browser plug-in that converted text to speech and provided a more convenient web navigation mechanism for blind people, and developing a system that would allow sighted web designers to experience the web as blind people. Her browser plugin became a 1997 IBM product, the IBM Home Page Reader, and within five years it had become the most widely used web-to-speech system available.

More recently her work has also studied accessible control of multimedia content, technological and social changes that would allow elderly people to work for more years before retiring, and the development of technology that would make the physical world more accessible to blind people. Currently, Asakawa has finished working on a lightweight suitcase robot helping blind people navigate through complicated terrain.

== Awards and honors ==
Asakawa was added to the Women in Technology International Hall of Fame in 2003. She became an IBM Fellow, IBM's top honor for its employees, in 2009, becoming the fifth Japanese person and first Japanese woman with that honor. In 2011 the Anita Borg Institute for Women and Technology gave her their Women of Vision Award. She was a keynote speaker at the Fourth International Conference on Software Development for Enhancing Accessibility and Fighting Info-exclusion (DSAIE 2012). In 2013 the Japanese government awarded her their Medal of Honor with Purple Ribbon. A paper she wrote in 1998 with Takashi Itoh describing their work on web user interfaces for blind people was the winner of the 2013 ACM SIGACCESS Impact Award. In 2017, she was elected as an international member of the US National Academy of Engineering for developing technologies for the visually impaired to access digital information. In 2022 Asakawa was elected as a new member to the American Academy of Arts and Sciences.
