= Moraleda =

Moraleda is a Spanish surname. Notable people with the surname include:

- Amparo Moraleda Martínez (born 1964), Spanish business executive
- Francisco Moraleda (born 1901), Spanish footballer
- Kenneth Moraleda (born 1973), Filipino actor
- José de Moraleda y Montero (1750–1810), Spanish naval officer and cartographer
