= Diane Pozefsky =

American computer scientist

- Education: Brown University, University of North Carolina at Chapel Hill
- Scientific career
- Fields: Computer scientist
- Workplaces: University of North Carolina at Chapel Hill, IBM
- Doctoral advisor: Mehdi Jazayeri

Diane P. Pozefsky is a research professor at the University of North Carolina in the department of Computer Science. Pozefsky was awarded the Women in Technology International (WITI) 2011 Hall of Fame Award for contributions to the fields of Science and Technology.

== Education ==
Pozefsky earned a A.B in applied mathematics from Brown University in 1972 and her Ph.D. from the Department of Computer Science at UNC in 1979 under the tutelage of Doctor Mehdi Jazayeri.

== Career ==
Pozefsky joined IBM Corporation, Raleigh, NC, in 1979 as a member of the Communication Systems Architecture Department working in the specification and application of the Systems Network Architecture (SNA), a large and complex feature-rich network architecture developed in the 1970s by IBM. Similar in some respects to the OSI reference model, but with a number of differences. SNA is essentially composed of seven layers. She worked for IBM for 25 years and was named an IBM Fellow in 1994 in recognition of her work on APPN and AnyNet architectures and development. She was tasked with the network and application design for the 1998 and 2000 Olympics. Her work life has largely been focused on networking and software engineering, including:

- developing networking protocols
- deploying the network at the Nagano Olympics
- development processes
- storage networking
- application development
- mobile computing

She has worked in development, design, and architecture and two areas that she has become particularly interested in later in here career are improving quality and blending theory and practice.

Dr. Diane Pozefsky returned to UNC after retiring from IBM in June 2004. In 2018, Pozefsky was the Director of Undergraduate Studies and professor of computer science at UNC-Chapel Hill. At UNC, she advocates for the inclusion of women and underrepresented people in computer science. In 2019, the Department of Computer Science UNC renamed the Learning Assistant Award to honor Pozefsky, following her 2019 retirement, as the Diane Pozefsky Learning Assistant Award and included a monetary amount.

== Publications ==
Pozefsky's publications include:

- “Storage Networking: More than an SNA Anagram” in NCP and 3745/46 Today, Summer 2001.
- “MPTN Transport Gateway”, with D. Ogle in SNA and TCP/IP Enterprise Networking, Manning Publications Co, 1997.
- “Multiprotocol Transport Networking: Eliminating Application Dependencies on Communications Protocols” with R. Turner et al., IBM Systems Journal volume 34 issue 3, pp. 472–500, July 1995.
- “Multiprotocol Transport Networking: A General Internetworking Solution” with K. Britton et al., Proceedings of 1993 International Conference on Network Protocols, pp. 14–26, IEEE Computer Society Press, October 1993.
- “SNA’s Design for Networking” with D. Pitt and J. Gray, IEEE Network volume 6 number 6, pp. 16–31, November 1992.
- “LAN-PBX Gateway Alternatives” with J. Gray and D. Pitt, Proceedings of the IFIP TC 6/WG 6.4 International In-Depth Symposium on Local Communications Systems: LAN and PBX, pp. 143–156, Elsevier Science Publishers, 1987.
- “SNA Networks of Small Systems” with Baratz et al., Selected Areas in Communications volume SAC-3 Number 3, pp. 416–426, May 1985.
- "A Meta-Implementation for Systems Network Architecture," with F. D. Smith, IEEE Transactions on Communications, COM-30(6) pp. 1348–1355, June 1982.
- “Space-Efficient Storage Management in an Attribute Grammar Evaluator”, with M. Jazayeri, ACM Transactions on Programming Languages and Systems volume 3 issue 4, pp. 388–404, October 1981.
- "The SNA Meta-Implementation: Language and Applications," with F. D. Smith, ICC '81 International Conference on Communications, 9.2.1-9.2.5, June 1981.
- “A Space Improvement in the Alternating Semantic Evaluator”, with M. Jazayeri, Proceedings of the ACM 1980 Annual Conference, pp. 498–504, January 1980.
- “A Family of Pass-Oriented Attribute Grammar Evaluators”, with M. Jazayeri, Proceedings of the ACM 1978 Annual Conference, pp. 261–270, December 1978.
- “Efficient Multipass Evaluation of Attribute Grammars Without a Parse Tree,” Proceedings 1977 Conference Information Sciences and Systems, Johns Hopkins University, pp. 184–89, March 30-April 1, 1977.
- “Systems Programming Languages” with Bergeron et al. (as Shecter) in Advances in Computers 12, pp. 175–284, 1972.

== US Patents ==
US Patents

- 6,430,604 “Technique for Enabling Messaging Systems to Use Alternative Message Delivery Mechanisms” with Ogle et al., issued August 6, 2002
- 5,802,053 “Transport Gateway Between a Native Network and a Mixed Network” with Bollella et al., issued September 1, 1998
- 5,491,693 “General Transport Layer Gateway for Heterogeneous Networks” with Britton et al., issued February 13, 1996
- 5,425,028 “Protocol Selection and Address Resolution for Programs Running in Heterogeneous Networks” with Britton et al., issued June 13, 1995
- 5,361,256 “Inter-Domain Multicast Routing” with Doeringer et al., issued November 1, 1994
- 5,224,098 “Compensation for Mismatched Transport Protocols in a Data Communications Network” with Bird et al., issued June 29, 1993
- 5,109,483 “Node Initiating XID Exchanges Over an Activated Link Including an Exchange of Sets of Binding Signals Between Nodes for Establishing Sessions” with Baratz et al., issued April 28, 1992
- 5,101,348 “Method of Reducing the Amount of Information Included in Topology Update Messages in a Data Communications Network” with Arrowood et al., issued March 31, 1992
- 4,967,345 “Method of Selecting Least Weight Routes in a Communications Network” with Clarke et al., issued October 30, 1990
- 4,954,821 “Method of Establishing Transmission Group Numbers for Network Links” with Gray et al., issued September 4, 1990
- 4,914,571 “Locating Resources in Computer Networks” with Baratz et al., issued April 3, 1990
- 4,873,517 “Method for Selecting Least Weight End Node to Ned Node Route in a Data Communications Network” with Baratz et al., Issued October 10, 1989
- 4,827,411 “Method of maintaining a Topology database” with Arrowood et al., issued May 2, 1989
- 4,736,369 “Adaptive Session Pacing” with Barzilai et al., issued April 5, 1988
