= Jaleh Daie =

American scientist, educator and entrepreneur

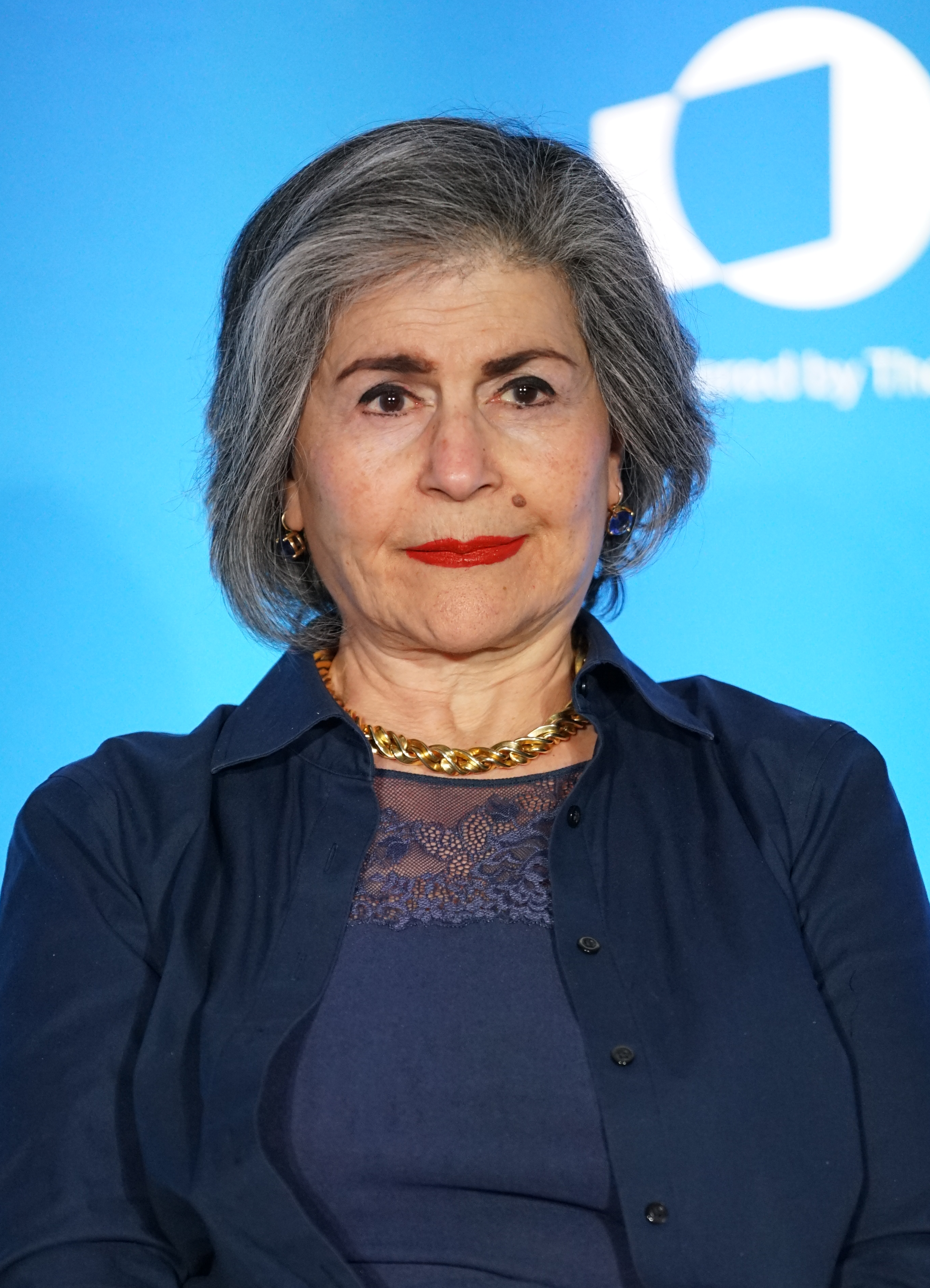
Daie at CES 2026

Jaleh Daie is an American scientist, educator and entrepreneur. She is currently a managing partner at Aurora Equity and seed investor for Band of Angels. Daie was the first woman to serve on the U.S. Space Foundation board of directors and was inducted into the Women in Technology International Hall of Fame in 1996.

== Biography ==
Jaleh Daie was born in Iran, and studied there before moving to the U.S. Then she became a professor at Rutgers University, conducting research in biology by studying the "molecular and cellular physiology of carbohydrate transport and metabolism in plants". After achieving full professorship, she became the first woman to be elected chairman of her department, and was also named Henry Rutgers Fellow. Next Daie taught at the University of Wisconsin-Madison, and served a number of advisory roles: she was a senior science advisor for the university, a science liaison to the President's National Science and Technology Council, and a special assistant to the chief scientist at NOAA.

Daie was involved in numerous boards and organizations during this time. She was chairwoman for the Council of Scientific Society Presidents, board member for Sigma Xi, and president of the Association for Women in Science. She also headed the science department of the David and Lucile Packard Foundation, managing a $120 million budget for science and technology. She served in civic organizations, including the U.S. Space Foundation, where she became treasurer and later their first female board member. Daie also began serving in advisory roles to corporate boards, like Nokia Innovent and Investigen, and taking on venture capital roles. In 1996, she was inducted into the inaugural class of the Women in Technology International Hall of Fame.

Daie then left the University of Wisconsin-Madison to focus on investing in technology startups through her roles as managing partner at Aurora Equity and member of the Band of Angels. Aurora Equity is a venture investment firm for tech companies in Silicon Valley, and there she focuses on investing in biotech and life science companies. At the Band of Angels, she is the chairman and founder of the AgFoodTech special interest group. Along with these investing positions, she has been an advocate for women and girls in science and technology. Dr. Daie is also a member of the Iranian American Women Foundation, and she continues her membership in these organizations to this day.
