= Sonja Bernhardt =

Australian technologist and entrepreneur

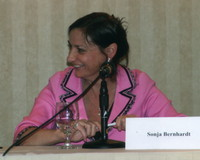
- Sonja Bernhardt presenting at WITI (Silicon Valley, 2005)
- Born: Sonja Bernhardt; 1959 (age 66–67); Launceston, Tasmania
- Occupation: Project Manager
- Employer: ThoughtWare Australia
- Known for: promotion of women in IT especially the under-representation of women in technology
- Title: CEO
- Spouse: Robin Craig
- Children: Naomi (1982), Tom (1984) and Kira (2003)
- Website: ThoughtWare Australia

Sonja Bernhardt OAM (born 1959) is an Australian information technology industry figure involved in mentoring and role model programs for women in IT. She was founder and Inaugural President of WiT (Women in Technology) in Queensland in 1997 and co founder and Inaugural President of AWISE (Australian Women in IT, Science and Engineering) in 2005, not for profit industry groups running community based projects and programs to encourage women and girls into technology careers. She is responsible for the 2007 Screen Goddess IT Calendar, IT's Million $ Babes Awards and Doing IT Around the World.

== Career ==
Sonja Bernhardt (born 1959 in Launceston, Tasmania) was employed as a consultant by Mincom Limited prior to February 1999 when she established her own software development firm – ThoughtWare Australia.

Community projects
Bernhardt is active in the area of supporting women in IT especially addressing the under-representation of women in technology, and towards these goals both founded WiT in Queensland and co-founded AWISE, a national Australia umbrella group. Through AWISE and WiT Bernhardt has been involved in many girl and women in technology perception altering, awareness raising, mentoring and role model projects. For example, Go Girl - Go For IT and the Board Readiness Program. She has been featured as a female role model by both the Queensland Government and Australian Government.

Bernhardt initiated community projects including the controversial "Screen Goddess IT Calendar", which featured 20 female role models in poses inspired by famous movies, "IT's Million $ Babes Award" recognising successful Australian female entrepreneurs, and "Doing IT Around the World", a diary and series of e-booklets featuring the work and lives of 36 women in technology around the world on 11 August (chosen as the date Hedy Lamarr was awarded the spread spectrum patent) 2008.

== Volunteer positions ==
- 2010 Technical committee invited member of the ACIITC (Aged Care Industry Information Technology Council)
- 2009 Foundation Member of ACIVA (Aged Care IT Vendors Association)
- 2008 Regional Coordinator for the Asia Pacific Centre for Women and Technology (1 of 10 regional centres)
- 2007 Member of APEC Digital Forum committee
- 2007 Appointed to the UN supported International Taskforce for Women and ICT's
- 2004–2005 Member of Federal ICT Summit Advisory Group
- 2003–2005 Appointed to Australian Government's Business Higher Education Round Table (B-HERT) - science & technology careers taskforce
- 1998–2004 Appointed to the Queensland Government ICT Ministerial Advisory Group – Industry Development –

== Awards and recognition ==
- first Australian inducted into the WITI (Women in Technology International) Hall of Fame (2005)
- WITI (Women in Technology International) Hall of Fame (2005)
- Optus ICT Achievement Award (2009)
- Queensland Government "Our Women, Our State" Awards - Industry or Business Category (2009)
- Listings in multiple Australian Who's Who publications
- Medal of the Order of Australia (OAM) for services to the IT industry (2011)
- Elevated to the Pearcey Hall of Fame as "a champion of women in IT and an innovator behind results-achieving women in science and technology groups across Australia since the 1990s" by the Pearcey Foundation (2019)

== Publications ==
- Gender Inequality and the Potential for Change in Technology Fields (2018, co-authored with Patrice Braun and Jane Thomason). An update to ″Women in IT in the New Social Era″. Despite the wide variety of theories proposed in efforts to frame and understand the issues, to date none have been accepted as a universally accurate framework, nor been applicable across varying cultures and ethnicities.
- Blockchain Technology for Global Social Change (2019, co-authored with Jane Thomason, Tia Kansara and Nichola Cooper). An academic work on the disruptive global improvements possible with blockchain technology.
- Women in IT in the New Social Era: A Critical Evidence-Based Review of Gender Inequality and the Potential for Change (2014). In this academic book, Bernhardt argues that major issues no longer exist for women in technology careers and most of the numerical deficit is due to personal choice, while the few remaining barriers will be eliminated by the new Social Era.
- IT Workers: Human Capital Issues in a Knowledge-Based Environment (2006: Information Age Publishing). Bernhardt co-authored a chapter of this book titled "Employment Sharing for IT Micro and Small Business."
- The Encyclopedia of Gender and Information Technology Bernhardt wrote a chapter for this encyclopedia: "Boards, IT Skills and Women - the Australian Context".
- Regular contributor to The Education Technology Guide (published by the Australian Media Group). Topics have covered gender and ICT, ICT on school boards and nanotechnology.
- Regular speaker on ABC Local Radio (most regularly on 91.7 ABC Coast FM) discussing a range of technology and women in technology issues.
- Technology Diva's Top Tech Tips for Your Business: an interview with the Australian Businesswomen's Network (2009)
