= Santosh Kurinec =

American electrical engineer

- Citizenship: American
- Education: University of Delhi (Ph.D., 1980)
- Awards: Fellow of IEEE (2011); WITI Hall of Fame (2018)
- Scientific career
- Fields: Microelectronics, Electronic Engineering, Physics,
- Workplaces: Rochester Institute of Technology (1988–present) IBM Watson Research Center (2008–present); Florida A&M University – Florida State University College of Engineering (1986–88) University of Florida (1985–86) National Physical Laboratory of India (1980–85)
- Website: people.rit.edu/~skkemc/

Santosh Kurinec is an IEEE fellow and a professor of Electrical & Microelectronic Engineering at Kate Gleason College of Engineering in Rochester Institute of Technology (RIT). She is an Indian American electronic engineer specializing in electronic materials and devices. She is a former IEEE Electron Devices Society distinguished lecturer. In 2018, she was inducted into the Women in Technology International (WITI) Hall of Fame.

== Early life ==
Kurinec received her B.S., M.S., and Ph.D. degrees in physics from University of Delhi. Her Ph.D. research was on the development of a high permeability ferrite ceramic material for engineering applications. This experience enabled her career transition from physics to applied materials science. From 1980 to 1985, she worked as a scientist at the National Physical Laboratory in New Delhi, where she helped to develop a polysilicon photovoltaics program.

== Career ==
Kurinec worked as a postdoctoral research associate at the Department of Materials Science and Engineering at University of Florida from 1985 to 1986. She worked as an assistant professor of Electrical Engineering at the Florida A&M University – Florida State University College of Engineering from 1986 to 1988, before joining RIT as an associate professor in 1988.

She succeeded Lynn Fuller as the second Head of the Department of Microelectronic Engineering in RIT from 2001 to 2009. Kurinec has served as a visiting scholar and researcher at the IBM Watson Research Center in New York since 2008. She has also served as a visiting professor in Qatar and Saudi Arabia. She was a Distinguished Lecturer of IEEE Electron Devices Society.

Her research interests include electronic materials and devices, non-volatile memory, photovoltaics, and integrated circuit materials and processes. In 2000, her team discovered the structure type of Tantalum zinc oxide (Ta_{2}Zn_{3}O_{8}) and determined the unit cell to be of monoclinic type. She has authored or co-authored more than 100 publications in conference proceedings and research journals. She is a Member of New York Academy of Sciences and American Physical Society. She is currently a representative in the Journal of Photovoltaics Steering Committee of IEEE Electron Devices Society.

== Awards ==
Kurinec received several awards for her contributions to the field of microelectronics and engineering education. Most notably, she was inducted into the Women in Technology International (WITI) Hall of Fame in 2018 and she was elected as a Fellow of IEEE in 2011, for leadership in integrating innovative microelectronics research in engineering education. She received the Medal of Honor from the International Association of Advanced Materials in 2016. She received the IEEE Undergraduate Teaching Award in 2012, for distinguished contributions integrated research into undergraduate engineering education to develop microelectronic engineers well prepared for future challenges. She was awarded as the Engineer of Distinction in 2012 by the Rochester Engineering Society. She also received the RIT Trustee Scholarship Award in 2008.
