= Melendy E. Lovett =

American businesswoman, accountant, consultant, and advocate

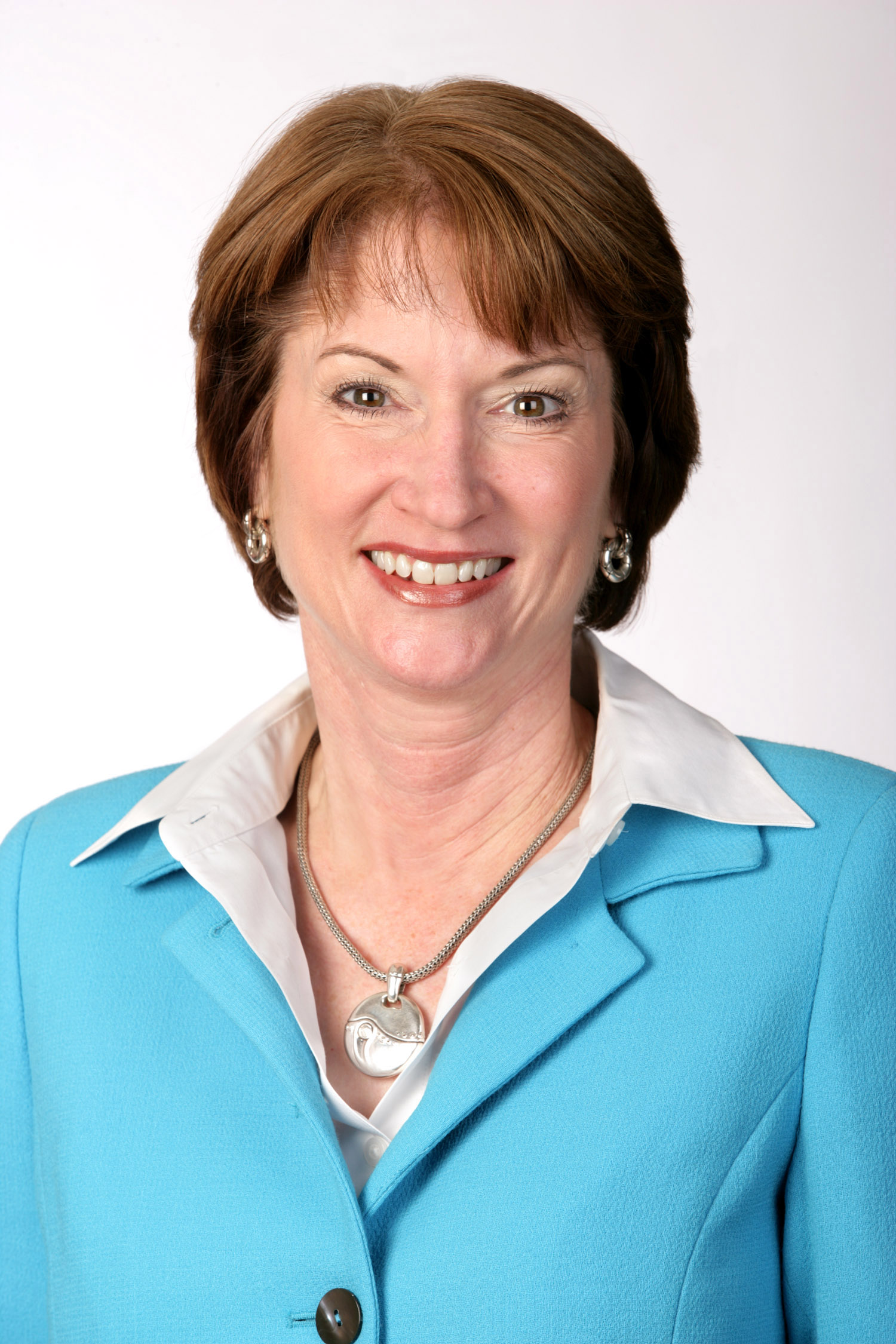
- Born: 1959 (age 65–66); Terrell, Texas, US
- Occupation(s): Senior Vice President & Chief Administrative Officer, Trinity Industries
- Spouse: James Robert Lovett
- Children: Alexa Pass
- Awards: Distinguished Alumni Award from University of Texas at Dallas (2005), Maura Award (2013)

Melendy Ewing Lovett (born ca. 1959) is an American businesswoman, accountant, consultant, and advocate for women in STEM education and in the workforce. Lovett is the Senior Vice President and Chief Administrative Officer at Trinity Industries. She was formerly a Senior Vice President of Texas Instruments and the President of the company's worldwide Education Technology business, which focuses on market-leading educational technology to improve teaching and learning of math and science. She is now the chief administrative officer at Trinity Industries.

She is one of the original founders, a former president, and a current board member of High-Tech High Heels (HTHH), a nonprofit organization which works to improve math and science education for girls in middle schools and high schools.

== Early life and family ==
Lovett was born and raised in Texas. She lived in Terrell for three years and then moved to Dallas. She is the daughter of J. Ralph Ewing and Frances Roach Ewing, who were both born and raised in Terrell. Her father worked in banking and her mother was a stay-at-home mom who occasionally worked as an office assistant and a substitute teacher. Her father died on April 28, 2003, in Dallas, Texas. She is the youngest of four children, with one older brother, Mark V. Ewing, and two older sisters, Marcy Ewing Van Galen and Molly Ewing Green. Lovett is married to James Robert Lovett, with whom she has a daughter, Alexa Pass.

== Career ==
Lovett graduated and earned her bachelor's degree in management from Texas A&M University and became a Certified Public Accountant (CPA) in 1979. Lovett went to work for Republic Bank in the information technology department. She later worked at ARCO Oil and Gas as a natural gas revenue accountant for five years. During her time there, she earned her master's degree in accounting from the University of Texas at Dallas in 1982 and retired from ARCO in 1985 through the company's voluntary retirement program.

After retiring from ARCO, Lovett joined the consulting firm Coopers and Lybrand and became a Senior Manager of the firm. Her work included leading consulting engagements in human resources, mergers, manufacturing and distribution, communications, retail, oil and gas industries, and a variety of other industries.

Lovett joined Texas Instruments in 1993 as a manager and information technology consultant; she worked for its Motorola program. After two years, she moved into the company's human resources department. She was eventually promoted to vice president and Manager of Human Resources. In 2004, Lovett was named Senior Vice President and President of Texas Instrument's Education Technology business. Lovett was the first woman to hold the position of a business president at Texas Instruments.

In 2012, Trinity Industries elected Lovett to its board of directors. In 2014, Lovett announced her retirement from Texas Instruments. In the same year, Lovett was named Senior Vice President and Chief Administrative Officer of Trinity Industries and resigned her directorship at the company.

== Awards and recognitions ==
In 2001, Lovett co-founded the High Tech High Heels (HTHH) program and was appointed the president of the organization, whose mission is to encourage young women into STEM professions. Lovett is a member of NAPE's Business Alliance Council and chairs the AVID Center's Board of Directors, where she heads the Finance Committee and is a Governance Committee member. Lovett is also a founder of the Women of TI Fund and continues to play an active role in supporting the fund.

In 2005, Lovett was inducted into the Women in Technology International (WITI) Hall of Fame. In the same year, Lovett also received the Distinguished Alumni Award from the University of Texas at Dallas, its highest honor for graduates. UTeach Dallas, a university program, partnered with Lovett which resulted in the 2010 TI gift-in-kind of training, and classroom technology including calculators and projectors. Lovett was also a keynote speaker at the 2013 Susan M. Arseven '75 Conference for Women In Science and Engineering (WISE) held by the university.
