= Judy Shaw =

American industrial technologist

Judy Shaw (born in Stillwater, Oklahoma) is an Inductee of the Women in Technology International Hall of Fame. She has retired from Texas Instruments where she had a role in semiconductor process technology. She has since been involved in Christian charities Real Options for Women in Plano, Texas and Shiloh Place McKinney in McKinney, Texas.
