= Barbara Grant =

American businesswoman

- Education: B.S. Chemistry Arizona State University Ph.D. Organic Chemistry Stanford University
- Employer: American River Ventures
- Known for: Venture Capitalist, former Vice President and General Manager in the Data Storage Division at IBM

Barbara Grant is an American businesswoman. She served in a variety of senior management positions at IBM for 21 years including vice president and General Manager in the Data Storage Division of Removable Media Storage Solutions. She continues to serve start-up and major corporations in a variety of capacities.

== Education ==
Grant received her Bachelor of Science degree in chemistry from Arizona State University and her Ph.D. in Organic Chemistry from Stanford University.

== IBM ==
Grant was employed at IBM for 21 years where she held several executive positions. Her last position was Vice President and General Manager in the Data Storage Division.

== Career accolades ==
Over her career she helped develop and introduce over 50 new products and received 8 patents. She has authored many publications in a variety of technology sectors. In 1996 she was elected to the inaugural group of the Women in Technology Hall of Fame.

== Current board memberships ==
- Sacramento Area Regional Technology Alliance
- Integrated Materials, Inc.
- Agoura Technologies, Inc.
- PlanarMag, Inc.
- Lumetric Lighting, Inc.
- Research Advisory Board - University of California, Davis
- Sacramento Area Region Technology Alliance (SARTA)

== Recognition ==
- 1996 - Induction, Women in Technology International Hall of Fame, Women in Technology International
