= Rhonda Childress =

American inventor and computer scientist

- Education: Kentucky State University
- Occupation: IBM Fellow Vice President
- Awards: State Bar of Texas IP Law Co-Inventor (2014) The Society of Women Engineers Spark Award (2016) Women in Technology International Hall of Fame (2018) Women of the Year at Women in IT Awards (2020)

Rhonda Childress is an IBM Fellow Vice President of GTS (Global Technology Services). She has earned the title of being the first Services woman to be called an IBM Master Inventor, Security Fellow, and the first Fellow from a predominantly African-American college from spending her whole career in SO (Strategic Outsourcing). She was also the first IBM fellow from a Historical Black University. Childress is a prolific inventor with over 200 patents, 130 of which are related to the management of systems, cyber security, mobile, aircraft, and IoT (Internet of Things). In 2018, she was inducted into the WITI (Women in Technology International) Hall of Fame for her efforts in her career at IBM. Childress is one of 25 female IBM fellow in IBM's history.

== Early life ==
One of six children, Childress grew up in Kentucky. Her family's source of income was low due to her father's heart condition and Childress said that her parents "made it very clear if I wanted to go to college, I'd have to find a way to pay for it." Due to her skill in advanced math and computer science, Kentucky State University offered her a full scholarship. During her college career she started her work at General Motors where she received her first opportunity to work on new inventions. She graduated Magma Cum Laude with a Bachelor in Computer Science.

== Career ==
Childress worked with IBM for two summers while going to the Kentucky State University for computer science before she received a job at General Motors in Michigan. Later she moved to McDonnell Douglas, an aerospace company, where she worked until 1993 when IBM received a strategic outsourcing deal, and she moved back to the company she had started in. While raising her two boys, she worked for IBM's clients on the strategy, processing, and servicing of security systems worldwide. While working with IBM Childress designed new firewall data and invented new security that compares the password's strength to the amount of time the password has been used, along with other new ideas she created during this time. She was appointed as the CTO of Security Services, a Fellow of IBM, and Master Inventor. In 2019, 1,096 patents were granted to IBM, and Childress was involved with 32 of them. Over her career, she has been involved with 182 grants. In 2020, Childress was awarded Women of the Year the virtual Women in IT awards.

Childress and her colleagues were granted a patent on their idea to track and organize travel supplies. Childress enjoys working with her hands using tools. In recent years, the electric table saw was her newest invention. When not working, Childress works on perfecting her competition chili recipe.

== Conferences attended ==
She attended 2018 Medical Innovation Summit Medical Innovation Summit brings together thought leaders and their passion about healthcare. Columbus, Ohio, United States Event Type Conference Industry Health Care, Medical

== Awards ==
Childress was awarded the title of Co-Inventor of the Year in 2014 by the State Bar of Texas IP Law. Two years later in 2016, she was honored by The Society of Women Engineers and selected for the Spark Award for her individual contributions of mentoring women through her volunteer work. Childress was inducted into the Women in Technology International in 2018 for her service at IBM, her advocacy for the advancement of women and minorities in the technology industry, and her awards over the years.
