= Kris Rinne =

American computer scientist

Kris Rinne is a technology person and retired Senior VP of network technology at AT&T Labs. She was an inductee to the 2013 Wireless Hall of Fame and the 2014 Women in Technology International Hall of Fame. She has been described as a key person in wireless technologies for her AT&T work.
