= Linda Sanford =

American technology executive (born 1953)

- Born: 1953 (age 72–73); Laurel, New York
- Education: St. John's University; Rensselaer Polytechnic Institute
- Occupation: Technology executive
- Known for: Work for IBM

Linda S. Sanford (born 1953) is an American technology executive. She worked at IBM for 39 years prior to her retirement on December 31, 2014, where she was the Senior Vice President of Enterprise Transformation.

== Education ==
Sanford graduated from St. John’s University, from which she also holds an honorary doctorate in commercial science. She also holds a M.S. in operations research from Rensselaer Polytechnic Institute.

== Career and acknowledgements ==
Sanford worked at IBM for 39 years. Her positions at IBM prior to becoming Senior Vice President of Enterprise Transformation included senior vice president and group executive in the company's Storage Systems Group and general manager of the S/390 Division.

She was inducted into the Women in Technology Hall of Fame in 1996.

In 1997, she was elected as a member of the National Academy of Engineering for computer product development including transformation from hierarchical mainframes to more robust enterprise network server architectures.

In 2018, St. John's University dedicated a new computer lab, called the Sanford Family Cyber Security Lab, in honor of Sanford and her family.

Sanford served on the Board of Trustees at the New York Hall of Science from 2013 to at least 2023.
