= Cisco DevNet =

Cisco development program

Cisco DevNet is Cisco's developer program to help developers and IT professionals who want to write applications and develop integrations with Cisco products, platforms, and APIs. Cisco DevNet includes Cisco's products in software-defined networking, security, cloud, data center, internet of things, collaboration, and open-source software development. The developer.cisco.com site also provides learning and sandbox environments as well as a video series for those trying to learn coding and testing apps.

== History ==
Cisco has a long history of building a developer community. Cisco began its developer initiatives in 2000 with the Architecture for Voice, Video and Integrated Devices (AVVID). At this time, most developers were focused on creating customizations for the Cisco VoIP phone systems.

At some point, the developer focus of the AVVID program grew, and Cisco launched the Cisco Technology Developer Program (CTDP). This evolved into the Cisco Developer Community (CDC) and Cisco Developer Network (CDN) in 2009. This growth extended the number of APIs used to build solutions on Cisco platforms, and included API guides, forums, downloads, and the early version of the sandbox system.

As Cisco's need to support developers grew, DevNet was launched in 2014 under leadership of Susie Wee. The new Cisco developer network contains APIs from many of Cisco's technologies, including networking, IoT, collaboration, open source, data center, and others. It also contains learning labs, a sandbox, and a community where developers can share their creations. DevNet also attends and hosts many developer events, such as hackathons and coding camps

DevNet holds developer events around the world, including the DevNet Zone at Cisco Live.

DevNet held its first DevNet Create developer conference aimed at an application developer and DevOps audience in San Francisco in May 2017. Guy Kawasaki spoke about "The Art of Innovation" during DevNet Create 2018. DevNet Create 2019 returns to the Computer History Museum in Mountain View, California April 24–25, 2019.

== Site Components ==
DevNet has several components that help developers learn how to code and work with Cisco APIs.

=== API Guides and Documentation ===
Cisco DevNet supports a wide variety of technologies. For each product, individual API guides and documentation are provided. Several API types are supported, depending on the product. For example, many of the newer technologies have REST APIs, while some of the older collaboration-based products might support XML coding.

=== Learning Labs ===
DevNet's Learning Labs provide self-paced tutorials and structured tracks covering Software Defined Networking (SDN) and other networking-specific areas.

=== Sandboxes ===
Sandboxes on DevNet provide a free space where people can try out their code in a network environment. Depending on the product, some sandboxes are virtual while others utilize lab equipment.

=== Sample Code ===
DevNet sample code exists can be uploaded from a GitHub repository to the DevNet Code Exchange. This tool allows developers to find, download, and contribute to code.

=== DevNet Exchange ===
The DevNet Exchange displays a variety of solutions, applications, and code that has been developed with Cisco products in mind by Cisco Partners. The site allows developers to explore code from other developers and provides a platform to showcase code.

== Awards ==
Best Overall Developer Portal Award, Community Spotlight & Outreach Award, and Best DX Innovation Award. 2018 DevPortal Awards

== Collaboration with Apple ==
In June 2016, Cisco and Apple Inc. announced a partnership at the Apple Worldwide Developers Conference. This partnership was intended to build greater interoperability between Cisco gear and Apple iOS. Some of Cisco's supported APIs include:

- Connected Mobile Experience (CMX)
- Cisco Spark
- Tropo
- Cisco Instant Connect

== Getting DevNet Certified ==
There are two ways to take the course: a self-guided self-regulated approach, or a structured approach where a training provider breaks the official curriculum down into lessons, labs and practice quizzes. Regardless of the approach taken, DevNet skill set can be broken down into five domains of knowledge.

1. Network Fundamentals (protocols, devices, connectivity options up/down the TCP/IP stack including knowledge of Linux)
2. Programming Skills (primarily Python)
3. DevOps Tools (CICD, SCM's such as Git etc.)
4. Infrastructure APIs (obviously, every vendor has their own so DevNet program focuses on Cisco)
5. Application development (or Integrations) and Deployment lifecycle

== See also ==
- Apple Developer
- Microsoft Developer Network
