= E. Gail de Planque =

American nuclear physicist (1944–2010)

Eileen Gail de Planque
- Born: 1944; New Jersey
- Died: September 8, 2010 (aged 65–66)
- Other name: Eileen Gail de Planque Burke
- Education: Immaculata University; New Jersey Institute of Technology; New York University
- Known for: Expert on environmental radiation measurements; First woman to become a commissioner at the Nuclear Regulatory Commission
- Spouse: Frank Burke
- Awards: Women of Achievement in Energy award (1990); Outstanding Woman Scientist of the Year award (1991); Henry DeWolf Smyth Award for Nuclear Statesmanship (2003); Women in Technology International Hall of Fame inductees (2004)
- Scientific career
- Fields: Nuclear physics
- Workplaces: United States Atomic Energy Commission; Nuclear Regulatory Commission; Environmental Measurements Laboratory

Eileen Gail de Planque (also Eileen Gail de Planque Burke, best known as E. Gail de Planque; 1944 – September 8, 2010) was an American nuclear physicist. An expert on environmental radiation measurements, she was the first woman and first health physicist to become a commissioner at the US government's Nuclear Regulatory Commission (NRC). Her technical areas of expertise included environmental radiation, nuclear facility monitoring, personnel dosimetry, radiation shielding, radiation transport, and solid state dosimetry.

== Career ==
Born in New Jersey and raised in Maryland, Planque earned her bachelor's degree from Immaculata College (mathematics, 1967), master's degree from the Newark College of Engineering (physics, 1973), and PhD from New York University (environmental health science, 1983). From 1967 until 1982, she worked as a physicist for the Atomic Energy Commission. She joined the Environmental Measurements Laboratory, US Department of Energy, as its deputy director in 1982, and was promoted to director five years later. From 1991 to 1995, she was a member of the NRC. In 1997, Planque chaired a planning committee, Celebration of Women in Engineering, which developed conferences that encouraged women to choose careers in engineering and included the development of the website EngineerGirl.

A fellow of the American Nuclear Society (ANS) and the American Association for the Advancement of Science, Planque was also a member of the National Academy of Engineering, the Association of Women in Science, and the National Council on Radiation Protection and Measurements. In the late 1970s, Planque was a US expert delegate to the international committee for Development of an International Standard on Thermoluminescence Dosimetry.

Planque served as president of the ANS from 1988 to 1989 the Health Physics Society, as well as Strategy Matters, Inc. She was Co-Chair of Committee for International Intercomparison of Environmental Dosimeters and director for Energy Strategists Consultancy, Ltd. She also served on the boards of Northeast Utilities Corporation, British Nuclear Fuels, EnergySolutions, Inc., Landauer, Inc., TXU Corporation, and BHP Billiton.

== Personal life ==
Planque was married to Frank Burke. She lived in New York City, and Potomac, Maryland. She died in 2010.

== Awards ==
- Women of Achievement in Energy award (1990)
- Outstanding Woman Scientist of the Year award (1991)
- Henry DeWolf Smyth Award for Nuclear Statesmanship (2003)
- Women in Technology International Hall of Fame inductees (2004)
