= Sharon Nunes =

American businesswoman

Sharon Nunes retired in 2012 from her position as Vice President of Big Green Innovations for IBM Corporation. She was inducted into the Women in Technology International Hall of Fame in 2009.

== Career ==
Nunes led the Big Green Innovations organization which includes IT leaders around the world developing solutions in water management, carbon management and photovoltaics. She was with IBM for 28 years in many positions including as the Vice President of Technology and has worked closely with IBM's Chairman and senior executive team to set the technology agenda for IBM. In the year 2000, she was one of the executive leaders of the Life Sciences business unit when it launched. In 1997, she launched IBM's Computational Biology Center.

== Committees and boards ==
Nunes is a leader on IBM's Women in Technology Executive Committee. In 2007, she launched the Technical Women's Leadership Forum for IBM. She is also a member of IBM's executive advisory council for the Society of Women Engineers. She is a member of the University of Connecticut Engineering Advisory Board and the Board of Directors for the University of Connecticut Foundation. Dr Nunes is a member of the Cape Cod Technology Council (CCTC), a member of the K-12 Committee of the CCTC and a volunteer mentor and coach for the Cape Cod StartUp Weekend program. 2

== Awards ==
- Frances E. Allen Mentoring Award in 2004
- NAFE "Women of Excellence" national award winner in 2006
- Inducted into the UConn Academy of Distinguished Engineers in 2006
- Women's History Month Honoree in 2009 as one of the "Women Taking the Lead to Save our Planet"
- Women in Technology International Hall of Fame 2009
- Nunes was elected a member of the National Academy of Engineering in 2019 for corporate leadership in development of next generation green technologies, focusing on novel materials and processes.

== Education and background ==
Nunes received her M.S. (1980) and her Ph.D. (1983) in Materials Science at University of Connecticut. She currently lives on Cape Cod.
