= Jennie Hwang =

American scientist, author, and businessperson

Jennie S. Hwang
- Born: 1949 (age 76–77)
- Education: Kent State University (MS); Columbia University (MS); Case Western Reserve University (PhD)
- Occupations: Businesswoman, engineer, scientist, author, speaker
- Employer: H-Technologies Group
- Known for: Electronic assembly technology, lead-free electronics
- Title: National President, Surface Mount Technology Association
- Board member of: National Academy of Engineering; U.S. Army Research Laboratories
- Awards: National Academy of Engineering (1998); Women in Technology International Hall of Fame; Ohio Women's Hall of Fame

Jennie S. Hwang is a Taiwanese businesswoman, entrepreneur, engineer, scientist, author, and speaker. She is the national president of the Surface Mount Technology Association, head of H-Technologies Group and the first woman to receive a PhD from Case Western Reserve University in Materials Science and Engineering.

== Biography ==
=== Education ===
Her formal education includes four academic degrees (Ph.D., M.S., M.A., B.S.), the Harvard Business School Executive Program and the Columbia University Corporate Governance Program.

=== Executive career ===
She has held senior executive positions with Lockheed Martin Corporation, Sherwin-Williams Company, and SCM Corporation (Hanson PLC). She was the CEO and co-founder of International Electronic Materials Corporation and the interim CEO of Asahi America, Inc. She has served on a number of boards and committees including university trustee, government-commissioned boards, and civic and non-profit boards. Currently, she is Chairman of the Assessment Board of the U.S. Army Research Laboratories and Chairman of the Review Committee on Army Engineering Centers. She has been a board member or a member of business, professional and non-profit organizations including the Economic Club of New York, American Chemical Society, American Ceramic Society, ASM International and Materials Information Society, Great Lakes Science Center and Council on World Affairs. She has been inducted into the National Academy of Engineering (1998) for entrepreneurship in electronic assembly technology.

=== Works ===
Hwang is listed as inventor on several U.S. patents. She is the sole author of seven (7) internationally-used books, co-author of three (3) technology and manufacturing books, and 700+ editorials and publications including two ground-breaking books on environmentally-friendly lead-free electronics which were published by Electrochemical Publications, LTD, U.K. and McGraw-Hill, U.S.A., respectively.

=== Recognition ===
She is a featured lecturer across the U.S. and in over twenty-eight countries on four continents. She was the commencement speaker for Kent State University in 2001 and the commencement speaker for Ohio University in 2007.

She is an inductee of the Women in Technology International Hall of Fame and the Ohio Women's Hall of Fame, as well as the recipient of the YWCA Achievement Award and Distinguished Alumni Award from, respectively, Case Western Reserve University and Kent State University. She has been inducted into the National Academy of Engineering (1998) for entrepreneurship in electronic assembly technology. She was named one of the R&D Stars-to-Watch by Industry Week.

=== Eponymous awards and grants ===
In 2019, the Dr. Jennie S. Hwang Endeavor Fund was established at the NAE. The endowment funds programs that support high school and college students to enhance exposure to diverse and/or international perspectives in engineering education, networking, and the profession. A YWCA award in Cleveland recognizing outstanding women college students who study in STEM disciplines is also named after her. In 2022, The Hwang Family Lounge was established at Case Western Reserve University - Department of Materials Science and Engineering providing an intellectual and informal networking facility for faculty and students.
