= Lauren States =

American computer scientist

Lauren C. States
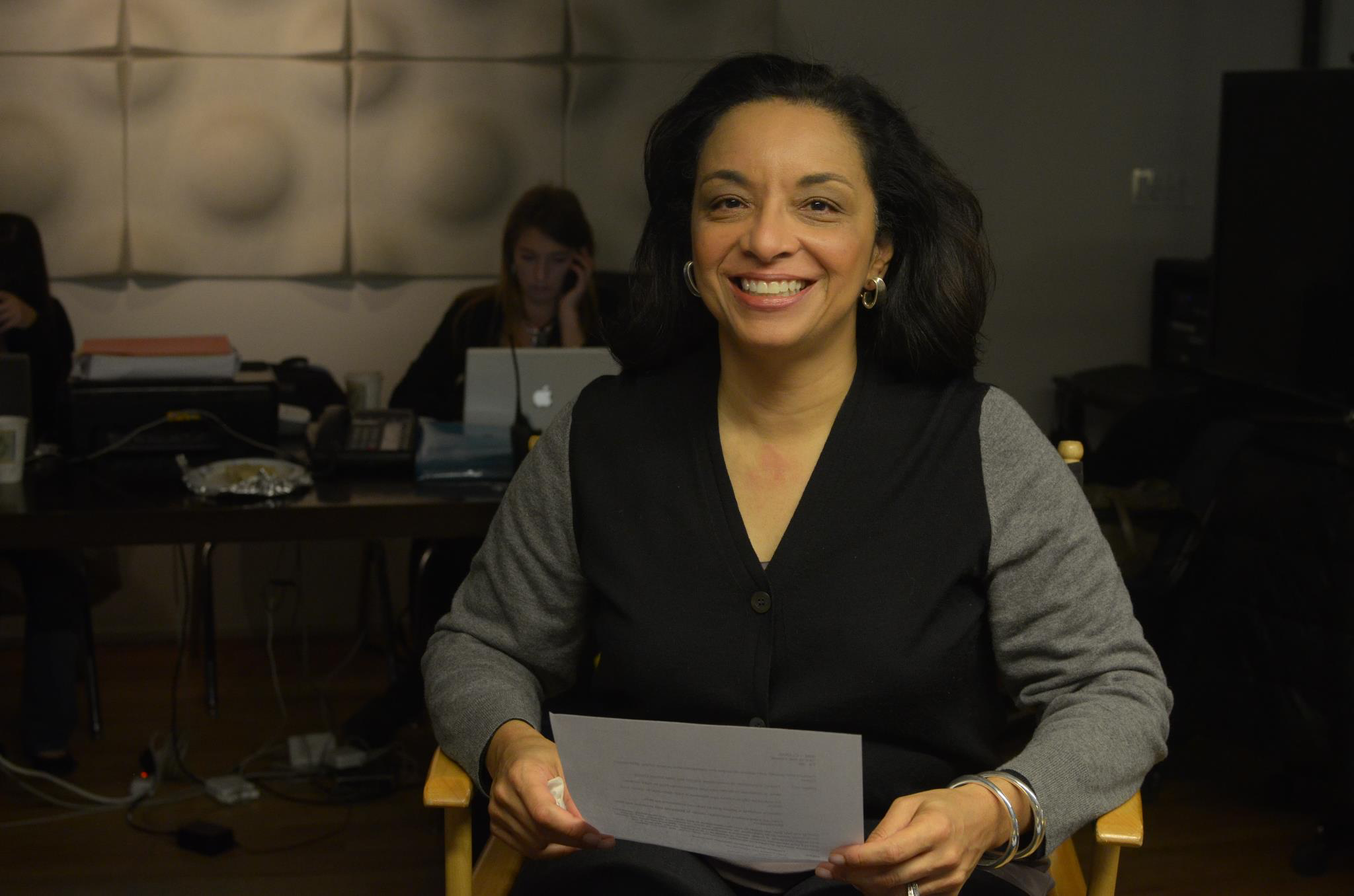
- Born: 1956 (age 69–70)
- Education: University of Pennsylvania
- Occupation: Chief Technologist
- Employer: IBM

Lauren States (born 1956) is a former chief of technology and then vice president of strategy and transformation for IBM's Software Group Division.

== Early life ==
Lauren States was born in the United States in 1956. Her mother was a successful nurse, and her father was one of the first black executives at the time, at Aetna Life and Casualty. States has said in interview that her parents were her first teachers in life, placing values in education, academic excellence, and confidence.

== Life ==
States has held numerous senior executive positions within IBM Software Group, IBM Corporate Strategy, and IBM Sales and Distribution.

States holds a Bachelor of Science in Economics from the Wharton School of the University of Pennsylvania and a Certificate in Business Excellence from Columbia University Business School Executive Education. She also completed a fellowship in Harvard’s Advanced Leadership Initiative in 2015.

States was named one of Savoy Magazine’s 2017 Power 300: Most Influential Black Corporate Directors. In 2014, she was inducted into the Women in Technology International Hall of Fame.

States serves as a director for Code Nation and a board trustee for International House of New York.

States has developed a management system, consisting of around 4,200 field agents, and technical sales support teams that allows large and small corporations from around the globe to be able to deploy IBM.
