= Maxine Fassberg =

South African-Israeli retired educator, engineer, and CEO

- מקסין פסברג
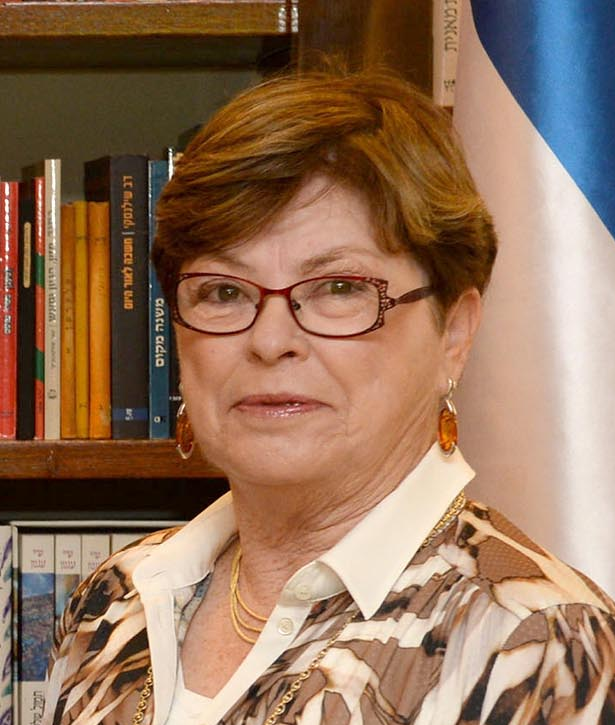
- Born: c. 1953 (age 72–73); Johannesburg, Transvaal, Union of South Africa
- Education: B.Sc., physics and applied chemistry, Hebrew University of Jerusalem, 1977; Diploma of education, Hebrew University of Jerusalem, 1978; M.Sc., organic chemistry, Hebrew University of Jerusalem, 1979
- Occupation: CEO
- Years active: 2007–2016
- Employer: Intel Israel
- Successor: Yaniv Garty

Maxine Fassberg (Hebrew: מקסין פסברג; born c. 1953) is a South African-Israeli retired educator, engineer, and CEO. She immigrated from South Africa to Israel in 1975 and earned bachelor's and master's degrees in chemistry at the Hebrew University of Jerusalem. After teaching high school chemistry for a few years, she switched careers and began working for Intel as a lithography engineer in 1983. She spent the next 33 years in key positions in that company, including factory manager, plant manager, and general manager (CEO) of Intel Israel. She retired in December 2016. She was inducted into the Women in Technology International Hall of Fame in 2009 and was named one of the "10 most powerful women in tech" by CNN in 2010.

== Early life and education ==
Born in Johannesburg to Ashkenazi Jewish parents from Europe that migrated to South Africa, Fassberg initially immigrated to Israel with her family in the 1960s and lived in the country for about seven years before they returned to South Africa. Although she studied in an ulpan in Petah Tikva, she found it difficult to acclimate to Israeli society. She completed high school in South Africa and, in 1975, immigrated to Israel once again. She pursued higher education at the Hebrew University of Jerusalem, earning her B.Sc. in physics and applied chemistry in 1977, her diploma of education in 1978, and her M.Sc. in organic chemistry in 1979.

== Career ==
=== Teaching ===
After earning her bachelor's degree, Fassberg began teaching high school chemistry at ORT Israel and Alliance Française high schools in Jerusalem. She also trained chemistry teachers at the Hebrew University of Jerusalem. When her application for a school principal position was rejected, she decided to switch career tracks.

=== Intel ===
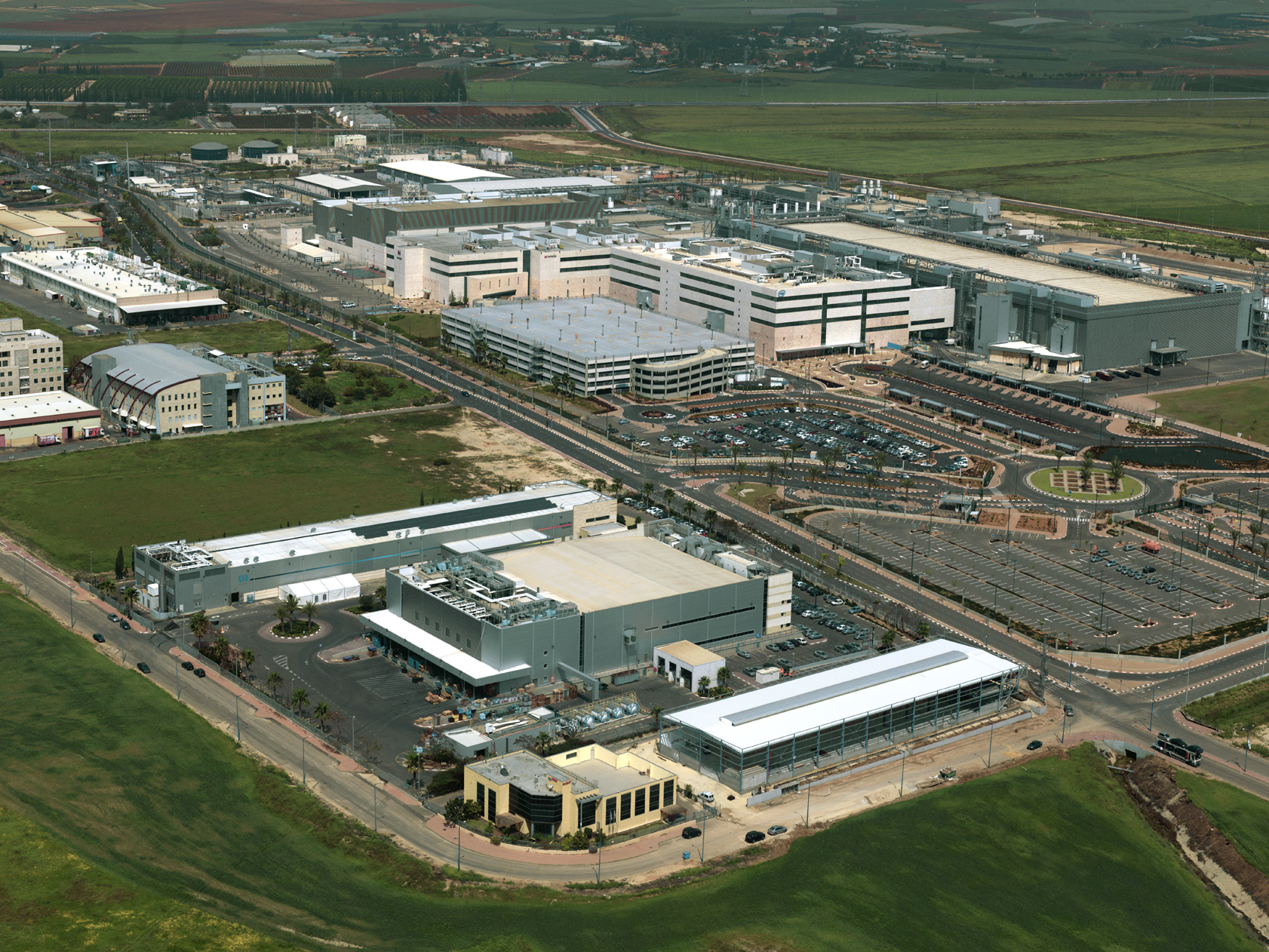
Intel fabrication plant in Kiryat Gat, c. 2008

When I managed the plant in Kiryat Gat, everyone thought I was the secretary.

— Maxine Fassberg, speaking on the stereotyping of women in management

In 1982 Intel launched a recruitment drive to staff its new Fab8 plant – its first factory built outside the United States. Fassberg applied and was hired in 1983 to work as a lithography engineer at Fab8. After completing a one-year factory training program in Arizona, she returned to Israel to work as a Manufacturing Area Engineer from 1986 to 1987 and a Fab8 Group Leader from 1988 to 1990 and 1992 to 1993. She was a polyimide engineer in the Portland Technology Development division from 1991 to 1992.

In 1995 Fassberg became part of the start-up team for the company's Fab18 factory in Kiryat Gat, first as public relations manager and then as manager of the engineering division. She oversaw the startup of the 45 nm chip plant, and subsequent upgrading of the plant to produce 28 nm and 22 nm chips. She was promoted to Fab18 factory manager in 2000, a position she co-held with Alex Kornhauser until 2004, when she was named Fab18 plant manager.

She was appointed vice president of Intel's worldwide technology and marketing group in 2004. In January 2006 she was appointed manager of the company's second factory in Israel, Fab28, also in Kiryat Gat. In June 2007 she was named general manager (CEO) of Intel Israel, with responsibility for developing the Intel Israel Site and the Fab28 factory. Under her leadership, exports increased from $1.54 billion in 2007 to $2.7 billion in 2010. In 2011 she was overseeing 7,300 employees.

Intel credited Fassberg's leadership for creating thousands of new jobs. She also encouraged women, Arabs, Druze, and Haredi Jews to enter the high-tech sector. By 2016, approximately 40% of the management positions at the Kiryat Gat plant were held by women, compared to 33% at other Intel factories in Israel. Fassberg herself often experienced prejudice and stereotyping as a woman in senior management. When she co-managed the Fab18 factory with Kornhauser, she says, people thought she was Kornhauser's secretary. Even when she was CEO, men addressed correspondence to her as Maxim, not Maxine.

== Memberships ==
Fassberg is a member of the Supervisory Council and Audit Committee of the Bank of Israel, the board of directors of the Hebrew University of Jerusalem, and the board of the Bloomfield Science Museum. She was a member of the Prime Minister's Round Table from 2008 to 2011 and the Advisory Committee to the National Economic Council in the Prime Minister's Office from 2009 to 2011.

== Awards and honors ==
Fassberg received the Industry Award of the Manufacturers Association of Israel in 2011, and the Hugo Ramniceanu Prize in Economics in 2012. She also received two Intel Achievement Awards for her contribution to the "inter-die electric material problem resolution".

She was inducted into the Women in Technology International Hall of Fame in 2009. In April 2012, CNN named her one of the "10 most powerful women in tech". In 2014 she was honored as one of the 14 women torch-lighters at the official Israel Independence Day ceremony.

Fassberg received an honorary doctorate from Ben-Gurion University in 2013.

== Personal life ==
She is married to Joseph Fassberg, a physician, with whom she has two children. The couple resides in Har Adar.
