= Julia Liuson =

Chinese American technology executive

Julia Zhenglei Liuson
- 潘正磊
- Born: Zhenglei Pan; 1970 (age 55–56); Shanghai, China
- Education: University of Washington (BS)
- Organization(s): Microsoft; GitHub

Julia Zhenglei Liuson (born Zhenglei Pan; Chinese: 潘正磊; pinyin: Pān Zhènglěi; born 1970) is a Chinese-born American technology executive. She served as the president of the Developer Division at Microsoft from November 2021 until June 2026, when she retired after 34 years with the company.

During her tenure, Liuson oversaw business and software development for Visual Studio and the .NET Framework, including Visual Studio Code, all programming languages, user interfaces, team development/testing tools, and platform adoption tools. In an interview with eWEEK, Liuson said Microsoft is working to help all developers, of all platforms and languages, be successful with tools which enable innovative scenarios.

== Early life and education ==
Zhenglei Pan was born in Shanghai, China in 1970.

In 1991, Liuson received a bachelor's degree in electrical and computer engineering from the University of Washington.

== Career ==
Liuson joined Microsoft right out of college in 1992. Her initial role was as a developer first on the Access team, and later on Visual InterDev, the precursor to Visual Studio. She has held a variety of technical and management positions at Microsoft, serving as development manager, and later as partner product unit manager for Visual Basic. Liuson was then named general manager of Visual Studio Business Applications, where she was responsible for enabling developers to easily build business applications on Microsoft server and service platforms.

Liuson served as general manager for server and tools business from Microsoft Shanghai office in China for two years while running engineering teams on both sides of the Pacific Ocean. She presented keynote speeches and guest speakers in some business and technology events including Connect() 2015, China Business Challenge 2014, and Technet 2013 for China.

In April 2026, Liuson announced her resignation from Microsoft after 34 years with the company. She continued as head of the Developer Division through June 2026, after which she transitioned to an advisory role reporting to Jay Parikh, chief of Microsoft's CoreAI division. No replacement was immediately named.

== Reception ==
In 2019, Liuson was inducted into the Women in Technology International Hall of Fame. In 2021 she was appointed to the Cadence Design Systems board of directors and remains on the board as of 2026.

== Personal life ==
She and her husband have a son.

== See also ==
- Microsoft
- Visual Studio
