= Amparo Moraleda Martínez =

Spanish business executive (born 1964)

Amparo Moraleda
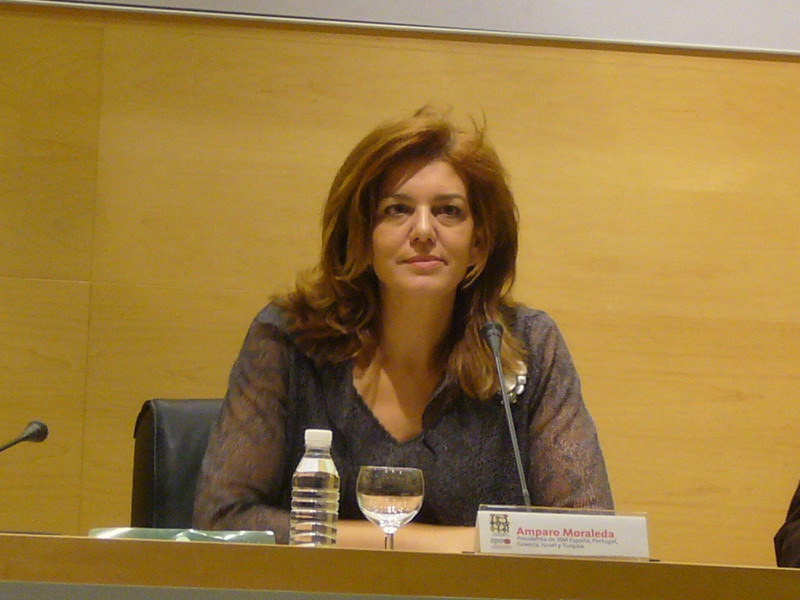
- Born: 1964 (age 61–62); Madrid
- Education: Comillas Pontifical University, IESE Business School
- Occupation: business executive

Amparo Moraleda Martínez (Madrid, 1964) is a Spanish business executive.

== Early life and education ==
Moraleda received a degree in industrial engineering at Comillas Pontifical University. She graduated from IESE Business School with an MBA.

== Career ==
In 1988 Moraleda joined IBM, and took the role of president for the company for Spain and Portugal in 2001. In 2005 she was named president of IBM Southern Europe (Spain, Portugal, Greece, Israel, Turkey). In the same year she was also inducted into the Women in Technology International Hall of Fame.

At the end of 2008, Moraleda left the company to join Iberdrola as International Director of Operations, a position she was in until February 2012. She became member of the Board of Directors of CaixaBank in 2014. In May 2015, she replaced Josep Piqué as Spanish advisor for Airbus. In October 2016, Moraleda joined the Royal Academy of Economic and Financial Sciences.

== Other activities ==
=== Corporate boards ===
- Maersk, Independent Member of the Board of Directors (since 2021)
- Spencer Stuart, Member of the advisory board (since 2017)
- Vodafone, Non-Executive Independent Member of the Board of Directors(since 2017)
- Airbus, Independent Member of the Board of Directors (since 2015)
- SAP Ibérica, Member of the advisory board (since 2013)
- KPMG Spain, Member of the advisory board (since 2012)
- Solvay, Member of the Board of Directors (2013–2021)
- Faurecia, Member of the Board of Directors (2012–2017)

=== Non-profit organizations ===
- Spanish National Research Council (CSIC), Member of the Governing Board (since 2010)
