= Net.Data =

- OS: IBM i, z/OS, Microsoft Windows, UNIX
- Website: https://www-306.ibm.com/software/data/net.data/

Net.Data is a programming language by IBM used largely for database-backed web applications. It is a server-side scripting language that extends Web servers by enabling the dynamic generation of Web pages using data from a variety of data sources. The data sources can include relational and non-relational database management systems.
