= Elizabeth Xu =

American Chinese business and technical leader

- Born: China
- Education: Peking University (BS, MS); University of Nevada, Reno (MS, PhD); Stanford University (MBA)

Elizabeth Xu is a Chinese businesswoman, author, and professor specializing in the developing advanced technology and digital business including software-as-a-service, big data, and mobile enterprise software.

== Early life and education ==
Xu was born in China. Her mother was a math teacher and her father was an English professor. Xu earned a Bachelor of Science degree in space physics and Master of Science in environmental science from Peking University. Xu then earned a Master of Science degree in computer science and PhD in atmospheric science from University of Nevada, Reno. Xu earned an MBA from the Stanford Graduate School of Business.

== Career ==
Xu was the Chief Technology Officer for CP Group, and the CEO of CP R&D, helping the Digital Transformation for a few hundred subsidiaries with combined revenue of $100 Billion and 450,000 employees globally. She was the CTO and SVP at BMC Software. Dr. Xu was also the Group VP Engineering at Acxiom, SVP at Rearden Commerce and Vitria Technology. She also held management positions at IBM.

Xu is an author of Myths of the Promotion: 10 Steps to a Successful Career, lecturer at Stanford University.

Xu is a co-inventor and patent owner in Architecture for web-based on-line-off-line digital certificate authority.

== Awards ==
Xu is a recipient of several awards and recognitions.

- 2015 Gold Stevie Award
- 2015 Women of Influence
- 2017 Women in Technology International Hall of Fame
- 2023 Forbes China Most Influential Chinese Elite Selection
