= Maria Azua =

American businessperson

Dr. Maria Azua is SVP of Distributed Hosting & Cloud Enablement Services for Fidelity Investments.

Her prior positions include Barclays Managing Director responsible for Engineering and Vice President of Advanced Cloud Solutions and Innovation for the IBM Global Technology Services division, and came to the position after having served as Vice President of Cloud Enablement for the IBM Enterprise Initiatives organization.

== Education ==
Azua is an honors graduate from the University of Puerto Rico With a bachelor's degree in math and physics. Her masters in computer science is from the University of Miami and her MBA from Florida Atlantic University. Maria holds a Doctorate in Computer Science from Pace University.

== Honors and awards ==
In 2006, Azua was inducted into the Women In Technology International (WITI) Hall of Fame and named one of the “100 Most Influential Hispanics” by People Magazine. The same year, the Society of Hispanic Professional Engineers (SHPE) recognized Azua with The Star Award. She has more than 50 patents.

== Publications ==
- The Social Factor – Innovate, Ignite, and Win Through Mass Collaboration and Social Networking (2009 IBM Press, Pearson Education).
