= Mehdi Jazayeri =

Mehdi Jazayeri is the founding dean of the faculty of informatics of the Università della Svizzera italiana (University of Lugano) in Lugano, Switzerland, and author of several textbooks on computer software. He was awarded the Influential Educator Award in 2012 by the ACM SIGSOFT.

Jazayeri received his BS in Electrical Engineering and Computer Science from the Massachusetts Institute of Technology (MIT) in Cambridge, Massachusetts in 1971, MS in Computer Engineering (1973) and PhD in Computer Science (1975) from Case Western Reserve University in Cleveland, Ohio. The faculty of informatics in Lugano was established in 2004 with bachelor, master, and PhD programs in computer science. There are currently around 150 students, faculty and researchers at the faculty. Mehdi Jazayeri was an assistant professor of computer science at the Computer Science Department of the University of North Carolina at Chapel Hill from 1975 to 1980. From 1980 to 1984 he worked at several Silicon Valley start-up companies. From 1984 to 1994, he was a researcher at the Hewlett-Packard Research Laboratories in Palo Alto, California. In 1994, he moved to Vienna as a professor of computer science at the Technical University of Vienna, where he led a group of researchers at the Distributed Systems Group. He was named a Fellow of the IEEE in 2007.

Jazayeri has been a keynote presenter at several conferences, including Automated Software Engineering 2004, IWPSE 2005: International Workshop on Principles of Software Evolution, and Software Engineering 06.

He was program chair of the European Software Engineering Conference and ACM Symposium on Foundations of Software Engineering, September 2007, Zurich, Switzerland, and program co-chair with Alexander Wolf of the International Software Engineering Conference, May 2000, Limerick, Ireland. He has been a session chair at conferences such as the 27th International Conference on Software Engineering, in May 2005.

== Books by Mehdi Jazayeri ==
- Software Engineering Education in the Modern Age. With P. Inverardi. (Springer Verlag, 2007; ISBN 3540682031)
- Fundamentals of Software Engineering. With C. Ghezzi and D. Mandrioli. (First edition: Prentice Hall, 1991; ISBN 0-13-820432-2. Second edition: Prentice Hall, 2003; ISBN 0-13-305699-6)
- Programming Language Concepts. With C. Ghezzi. (First edition: John Wiley & Sons, 1982; ISBN 0-471-08755-6. Second edition: John Wiley & Sons, 1987; ISBN 0-471-82173-X. Third edition: John Wiley & Sons, 1998; ISBN 0-471-10426-4)
- Software Architecture for Product Families: Principles and Practice. With A. Ran and F. van der Linden. (Addison-Wesley, 2000; ISBN 0201699672)
- The Proceedings of an International Seminar on Generic Programming. With R. Loos and D. R. Musser. (Springer Verlag, 2000; ISBN 3540410902)
- Process-Centered Software Engineering Environments. With P. K. Garg, (IEEE Computer Society Press, 1995; ISBN 0818671033)
