= IBM Home Page Reader =

IBM web browser designed for the blind

Home Page Reader

- Home Page Reader 3.0 rendering Wikipedia.
- Developer: IBM Special System Needs (SNS)
- Final release: 3.04 / 2005; 21 years ago
- Operating system: Windows 95/98/NT
- Platform: Windows
- Available in: English, French, German, Italian, Japanese, and Spanish
- Type: Screen Reader
- Website: Homepage (Archive.org)

Home Page Reader (HPR) was a computer program, a self-voicing web browser designed for people who are blind. It was developed by IBM from the work of Chieko Asakawa at IBM Japan.

HPR was introduced in 1998 for the Windows 95 operating system. The major innovation of HPR was that it directly used the HTML content of the web page to build its model of the content, allowing it to more flexibly handle interactions important for the Web, such as navigating content that scrolled off the screen, navigating between different frames, and interacting with form fields. The common way that screen readers attempted to work at the time was by directly "reading the screen."

The screen reader met World Wide Web Consortium (W3C) HTML 4.01 specifications, Web Content Accessibility Guidelines 1.0 and User Agent Accessibility Guidelines 1.0.

In 2006, it was announced on the HPR mailing list that IBM "does not have plans for any further updates of HPR" and the software was subsequently withdrawn from sale by IBM in December 2006. IBM has given code to be used as a Firefox extension.

The program also had a peer-support mailing list. (Note: Its archives were available at http://www.talklist.com/forms/ibm-hpr)

== System requirements ==
=== Hardware ===
HPR had the following hardware requirements:

- 166 MHz processor
- 32 MB RAM Windows 95/98; 64 MB RAM for Windows NT
- 14 MB hard disk space; 42 MB hard disk space for HPR and Netscape Communicator
- SVGA (640 X 480, 256 colors) graphics
- Windows-compatible: modem (28.8 Kbps), sound card (16-bit), and CD ROM drive (quad-speed)
- Integrated or separately attached numeric keypad

=== Software ===
HPR had the following software requirements:

- Microsoft Windows 95, 98 or NT 4.0
- Internet service provider (ISP) connection
- Netscape Navigator Version 3.01 or higher
- For Home Page Mailer, Microsoft Personal Web Server, Version 4.02 required for Windows 95/98; Peer Web Services, Version 4.0 required for Windows NT
- A mail program set up with preferences, or Microsoft Personal Web Server or Peer Web Services required for mailto: tags
