= Tia Kansara =

Dr Tia Kansara is a sustainable design expert and co-founder of Kansara Hackney in 2008 with architect Rod Hackney. She is also a visiting professor at CEPT University architecture school.

== Education ==
Kansara achieved her Duke of Edinburgh Award in 1999 while studying at Birmingham's City Technology College and was an International Baccalaureate ambassador to the UK Government.

In 2005 she graduated from the School of Oriental and African Studies in London with a degree in Economics with South Asian Studies and then moved to Japan for three years teaching English and studying Japanese. Following the 2011 Fukushima earthquake, recorded a fundraising song.

In 2016 she completed her PhD research at University College London on the theme of sustainable cities.

In November 2018, Kansara was named to the Financial Times' list of the 'Top 100 minority ethnic leaders in technology.'

== Personal life ==
Her family was originally from Gujarat, India and she is currently based in the UK and Abu Dhabi.
