= Yukako Uchinaga =

Japanese businesswoman (born 1947)

- 内永 ゆか子
- Education: University of Tokyo
- Occupation: Businesswoman

Yukako Uchinaga (内永 ゆか子, Uchinaga Yukako; born 1947) is a Japanese businesswoman, best known for her long career at IBM Japan.

== Biography ==
Yukako Uchinaga graduated from the University of Tokyo (1971) with a degree in Theoretical Physics from the University of Tokyo. She then joined IBM Japan as a systems engineer and worked in development and marketing.

In 1995, Uchinaga was appointed as a member of the board of directors of IBM Japan. She was inducted into the Women in Technology International hall of fame in 1999. She was awarded the ‘Prime Minister’s Commendation for Efforts Toward the Formation of a Gender-Equal Society’ in June 2013. She is the founder of and current board chair of J-Win (Japan Women's Innovative Network), a non-profit organization that promotes diversity in the workplace. She also serves on the boards of Sony Corp, AEON Co., Ltd., HOYA Corporation & DIC Corporation.

In an oral history interview from 2003, Uchinaga talks about the general assumption in Japan that women are not good at technology and how she had encounters with customers and engineers, who were surprised by her technical abilities. In 2008, Yukako Uchinaga, spoke at a Tokyo forum on diversity and inclusion and emphasized that diversity is key to transforming corporate cultures.
