= Wanda Gass =

American engineer and philanthropist

- Born: Dallas
- Education: Duke University; Rice University
- Scientific career
- Fields: Electrical Engineering, Biomedical Engineering

Wanda Gass is an American engineer and philanthropist who helped develop the first commercially viable digital signal processor at Texas Instruments. She is also an advocate for girls and young women pursuing careers in science, technology, engineering, and math (STEM) programs.

== Life ==
Gass was born in Dallas, Texas in 1956, the younger of two daughters. Citing her father as encouragement for her fledgling interest in engineering, Gass pursued membership in her high school's Explorer's Club.

== Education ==
Gass attended Rice University and earned her BS in electrical engineering in 1978. She then earned a MS in biomedical engineering from Duke University in 1980.

== Career ==
Gass began work at Texas Instruments in 1980 as an electrical engineer. Gass was heavily involved in the development of Texas Instruments first commercially viable digital signal processor (DSP) and was eventually promoted to the position of technical fellow. Gass was one of the first women promoted into this role, which was the equivalent of a Vice President at Texas Instruments.

Gass is a fellow of the Institute of Electrical and Electronics Engineers (IEEE). She is also the president of Design Connect Create, a non-profit group aimed at increasing young women's participation in STEM fields.
