= Women in Technology International =

Women in Technology International (WITI) is an organization promoting the achievements of women in technology and extending support, opportunities, and inspiration. It was founded by Carolyn Leighton in 1989 as the International Network of Women in Technology. It was renamed to the WITI Professional Association in 2001 when it acted as a trade association for women in technology.

It is known for producing the Women in Technology International Hall of Fame, which inducts women who have made a significant contribution to technology.

Started from an email group in 1989, by 2012 the group had grown to 2 million people and became the leading organization for women in technology. The 2014 WITI 25-year conference Powering Up! included speakers such as Gwynne Shotwell, President and Chief Operating Officer at SpaceX. In 2022, Randstad Technologies announced a partnership with WITI to address gender underrepresented groups in the workplace and encourage girls and women to pursue technology education and careers.

== History ==
Carolyn Leighton founded WITI in 1989, originally launched as The International Network of Women in Technology, to advance the careers of women working in all sectors of business and technology, while providing access to - and support from - others in their fields of interest. In 2001, WITI evolved into the WITI Professional Association. Driven by international demand, today WITI operates as a corporation offering a wide array of services and products for members and corporate partners.

== WITI Networks ==
=== WITI Professional Network ===
For professionals who consider technology central to their businesses and careers, WITI Networks provide connections, resources, and opportunities.

=== WITI Corporate Network ===
For organizations that want to hire employees, and use WITI's products and services. Businesses benefit by recognizing that women's leadership is an underserved economic forces powering the economy today.

=== WITI Industry-Based Network and Skills (WINS) ===
WITI WINS provide forums for professionals to network with each other, forge connections, share resources and discover opportunities in their technology industry.

The WITI WINS are established to help members transform their communities, fast forward their businesses and careers, and move through challenges using the tools, connections and resources WITI provides. Some of these include:

- Online and in-person forums
- Online access to technology business and professional resources
- Networking with core competency experts
- Member recognition programs
- On-line and offline mentoring programs
- Speaking opportunities at WITI and affiliate events
- Marketplace to promote WITI member businesses

== See also ==
- AnitaB.org
- Girls in Tech
- National Center for Women & Information Technology
