= List of IBM CEOs =

The following is a chronological list of people who have been chief executive officer of IBM, an American multinational technology and consulting corporation headquartered in Armonk, New York.

- Thomas J. Watson (1914–1956)
- Thomas J. Watson, Jr. (1956–1971)
- T. Vincent Learson (1971–1973)
- Frank T. Cary (1973–1981)
- John R. Opel (1981–1985)
- John Fellows Akers (1985–1993)
- Louis V. Gerstner, Jr. (1993–2002)
- Samuel J. Palmisano (2002–2012)
- Virginia Marie Rometty (2012–2020)
- Arvind Krishna (2020–)

== See also ==
- List of chief executive officers
