= Samuel J. Palmisano =

American businessman (born 1951)

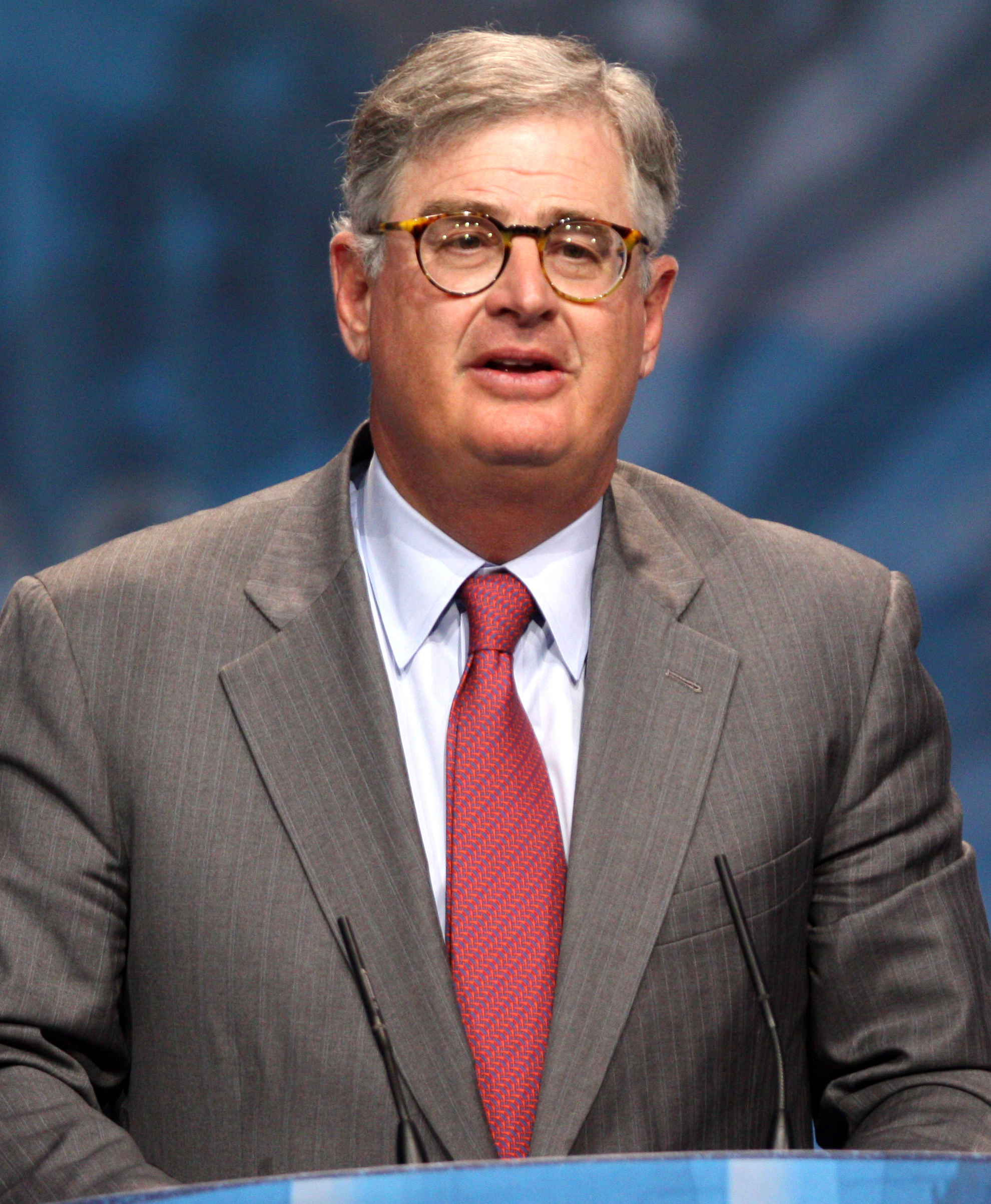
- Palmisano in 2013
- Born: July 29, 1951 (age 75); Baltimore, Maryland, U.S.
- Education: Johns Hopkins University (BA)
- Years active: 1973–present
- Employer: IBM (1973–2012)
- Title: Chairman, IBM
- Predecessor: Louis V. Gerstner, Jr.
- Successor: Virginia M. Rometty
- Board member of: IBM Corporation, 2000; ExxonMobil Corp., 2006
- Spouse: Gaier "Missy" Notman
- Children: 4
- Website: IBM - Samuel J. Palmisano; IBM Archives: Samuel J. Palmisano

Samuel J. "Sam" Palmisano (born July 29, 1951) is an American business executive. He was president and chief executive officer of IBM until January 2012, and chairman until October 2012.

Palmisano was appointed president and chief operating officer (COO) effective in October 2000. He was promoted to CEO in March 2002, while retaining the title of president, and chairman from January 2003. Palmisano announced on October 2011, that he was stepping aside as president and CEO. He was succeeded in these positions by Ginni Rometty.

As of 2009, IBM was the largest IT company in the world and 45th largest company overall.

== Education and personal life ==
Palmisano grew up in an Italian-American middle class family in Baltimore, Maryland. His father owned a body shop.

As an offensive lineman at Calvert Hall College High School in Baltimore, Maryland he prepared earnestly, studying pregame scouting reports and seldom missed a blocking assignment. He was also a union musician, and once was the opening act and played backup saxophone for The Temptations.

He holds a bachelor's degree in history from Johns Hopkins University where he was member of Beta Theta Pi. He also played football (center, offensive tackle, team co-captain) there, and turned down an opportunity to try out with the Oakland Raiders.

He met his wife, Gaier Notman, a 1969 alumna of Miss Porter's School, at an IBM training school.

== Career ==
=== IBM 1973-2012 ===
Palmisano joined IBM in 1973 as a salesman.

From 1989-1990, he had a one-year stint as executive assistant to then-chairman and CEO John F. Akers. During that time Palmisano was seen as a rising star and he had lunch with former chairman Thomas Watson, Jr. once per month. Palmisano afterwards ran the company's Japanese office.

He was appointed senior vice president and group executive of the Personal Systems Group in 1997. He was then promoted to senior vice president and group executive of IBM Global Services in 1998, during the period when IBM shifted its focus from pure technology to embrace outsourcing and other services. He became senior vice president and group executive of Enterprise Systems in 1999 when the systems group drove IBM's move to adopt the Linux operating system.

Before leading IBM Global Services, Palmisano led the IBM strategic outsourcing business and before that, he was president of an IBM subsidiary—Integrated Systems Solutions Corporation—which ultimately became IBM Global Services.

Palmisano was elected president and chief operating officer (COO) effective in October 2000.

==== Chief Executive Officer ====
Palmisano was promoted to CEO in March 2002 and named chairman effective January 1, 2003, succeeding the retiring Louis V. Gerstner, Jr. after the Dot-com bubble bust. While his predecessor had saved the company from bankruptcy by downsizing the workforce and cutting costs and then leading IBM's resurgence with systems integration and services consulting (such as e-commerce), Palmisano's goal was to reestablish IBM as a standard-setting company. He was influenced by the Watsons, the company founders who "always defined I.B.M. as a company that did more than sell computers; they believed that it had an important role to play in solving societal challenges".

Palmisano's mandate was to move into new businesses with high-profit margins and potential for innovation. This included purchasing PricewaterhouseCoopers Consulting in 2002 so that IBM could go beyond selling computers and software and help customers use technology to solve business challenges (marketing, procurement, and manufacturing). During his tenure, the company also acquired 25 software companies that specialized in data mining and analytics so that IBM could help companies and governments to find patterns in web and internal data. Palmisano also prepared the company for cloud computing, originally known inside IBM as on-demand computing, where the center of innovation would be services and software, delivered over the Internet from data centers and connecting to PCs and other devices.

In 2008, despite the financial crisis and economic recession , he launched I.B.M.’s Smarter Planet initiative which applies computer intelligence to create more efficient systems for numerous applications including utility grids and traffic management. Although the services and consulting businesses, which then-CEO Gerstner had championed, provided most of IBM's revenue, software analytics had higher margins, contributed more profits and had more growth.

Palmisano also led the sale of the PC group to Lenovo which closed in 2005. The move was controversial inside IBM, as it had invented the personal computer in the 1980s, and the PC was one of the company's few products widely used by the masses and created strong brand recognition for IBM. Although it fell behind rivals during the 1990s, that division helped drive sales of other I.B.M. products in corporate accounts, and its purchasing power helped lower the cost of components for larger IBM offerings like mainframes and servers.

As IBM's PC group was profitable and generated around US$20 billion in yearly revenue, the divestiture resulted in IBM ceding the title of the world's largest information technology firm (by revenue) to Hewlett-Packard, the latter whose revenue had increased due to the acquisition of Compaq in 2002. However to Palmisano, moving to new high-margin businesses meant exiting low-margin businesses like PC manufacturing, plus PC manufacturing was becoming commoditized and offered few opportunities for innovation. It took five years but Palmisano was vindicated from 2010 onward as the Post-PC era of technology took hold. Also recognizing that drives were becoming a commodity, he sold off IBM's disk drive business to Hitachi and then signed a five-year deal to buy Hitachi drives.

As CEO of IBM, Palmisano shifted many development and support positions to emerging markets.

He was elected to the board of ExxonMobil in 2006. In 2021, he was voted off the board after an ESG - based shareholder revolt led by activist hedge fund Engine 1. He is also the Honorary Chairman of National Engineers Week 2008.

In November 2008, Palmisano, during a speech at the Council on Foreign Relations, outlined IBM's Smarter Planet initiative.

While CEO of IBM in 2009, Palmisano earned a total compensation of $21,159,289, which included a base salary of $1,800,000, a cash bonus of $4,750,000, stocks granted of $13,517,401, no options, and other compensation of $1,091,888.

In 2010 Palmisano was awarded The Deming Cup, an excellence award presented by the W. Edwards Deming Center for Quality, Productivity, and Competitiveness at Columbia Business School, for his ability to drive IBM to new levels of operational excellence and for his role in creating and leading IBM's Global Services business unit.

Palmisano announced on October 25, 2011, that he was stepping aside as president and CEO, being succeeded by Ginni Rometty effective on January 1, 2012. Palmisano continued as chairman until October 1, 2012.

=== After IBM ===
Samuel J. Palmisano is the chairman of the Center for Global Enterprise, a private, nonprofit, nonpartisan research institution devoted to the study of contemporary corporation, the management science in a globally interconnected world. The CGE was established in 2013 to help educate societal stakeholders – as well as leaders from the private sector, public sector, and academia – on the globally integrated economy and its promise for a better future.

In May 2013, Bloomberg LP appointed Palmisano as an independent advisor for the company's privacy and data standards.

In February 2016, President Barack Obama appointed Palmisano as the vice chairman of a new White House cybersecurity commission tasked with helping the country better defend itself against and withstand cyber attacks, the Commission on Enhancing National Cybersecurity.

Business positions
Preceded by Louis V. Gerstner, Jr.	CEO of IBM; 2002-2012	Succeeded by Virginia M. Rometty
