= Organization of the U.S. Army Air Service in 1925 =

The Organization of the U.S. Army Air Service in 1925 is a snapshot of that service from its final major organizational change in June 1924, when the 1st Wing (then a training establishment) was inactivated, to its name change in July 1926 to the Air Corps. Except for activation of a school group from the Regular Army's Inactive component for primary flying training at March Field, (Note: The 13th School Group, activated July 31, 1927, consisted of the 47th, 53rd, and 54th School Squadrons, 70th Service squadron, and 23rd Photo Section. The group inactivated on April 30, 1931. Two other RAI school groups also constituted 6 Feb 1923, the 14th and 15th, were never activated in their original roles.(Clay 2010, p. 1306)) resulting in creation of the 24th School Wing, and reallocation of four existing tactical squadrons to new groups in 1927 and 1928, (Note: 6th and 19th Pursuit Squadrons from the 5th Composite Group to the 18th Pursuit Group, the 11th Bombardment Squadron from the 2nd Bombardment to 7th Bombardment Group, and the 23rd Bombardment Squadron from the 5th Composite Group to the 19th Bombardment Group.) the organization of the Air Corps remained largely unchanged from this list until November 1930.

The actual date of this list is February 15, 1925. At that time the Air Service had 32 tactical squadrons (eight pursuit, eight bombardment, two attack, and 14 observation), under the command of the corps areas and departments in which they were located, and 17 service and training squadrons controlled by the Office of Chief of Air Service (OCAS). The tactical squadrons were organized into seven groups and the divisional air services for three active Regular Army infantry divisions and six paper divisions. In addition to the seven tactical and two training groups active in the Regular Army, six additional groups had been constituted in the Regular Army Inactive (RAI) component to facilitate mobilization. (Note: These were the 7th Bombardment, 8th Pursuit, 12th Observation, and 13th through 15th School Groups. Ultimately the first four were activated by the Air Corps between 1927 and 1933 in their original designations.)

On that date the Air Service consisted of 922 officers and 8,749 enlisted men, out of authorized personnel ceilings of 1,516 and 8,800. In 1925 the Tenth Annual Report of the National Advisory Committee for Aeronautics, submitted by President Calvin Coolidge to the Congress on 8 December 1924, reported:

"The Air Service has 845 officers with rating as airplane pilots, airplane observers, airship pilots, airship observers, or balloon observers. In addition about 51 enlisted men have the rating of airplane pilot, junior airplane pilot, or airship pilot."

== Office of the Chief of Air Service ==
Munitions Building, Washington, D.C.

=== Administrative Group ===
18th Headquarters Squadron: Bolling Field (1st Lt. Lester J. Maitland)
56th Service Squadron (Capt. Lorenzo L. Snow)

=== Training and Operations Group ===
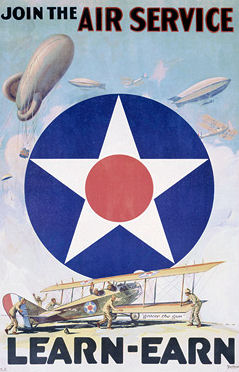

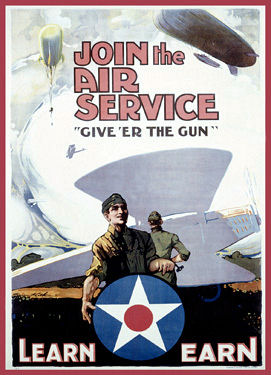

Advanced Flying School (formerly 1st Wing)
10th School Group: Kelly Field, Texas (Major Horace M. Hickam)

40th School Squadron (Capt. Frederick I. Eglin)
41st School Squadron (Capt. Gilbert T. Collar)
42nd School Squadron (1st Lt. Claude E. Duncan)
43rd School Squadron (Capt. Albert Guidera)
68th Service Squadron (1st Lt. Ralph D. Walker)

22nd Photo Section

Primary Flying School
11th School Group: Brooks Field, Texas (Major Ralph Royce)

46th School Squadron (1st Lt. Virgil Hine)
47th School Squadron (1st Lt. Edward L. Searle, Jr.)
62nd Service Squadron (1st Lt. Charles E. Branshaw)

Air Service Tactical School
Langley Field, Virginia (Major Oscar M. Westover)

50th Observation Squadron (2d Wg) (Capt. Floyd E. Galloway)
58th Service Squadron (2d Wg) (1st Lt. Joseph T. Morris)
19th Airship Company (2d Wg) (Capt. William O. Butler)

20th Photo Section

Field Artillery School

44th Observation Squadron (9th OG): Post Field, Oklahoma (Capt. Richard H. Ballard)

== Corps Area units ==
Divisional air services were co-located with the squadron assigned. In nearly all instances, the commander of the flying unit was also the divisional air service officer. Each corps area was also assigned an air service officer, but that officer did not exercise command authority over the units allotted to that corps area.

First Corps Area
Divisional Air Service, 9th Division

1st Observation Squadron (9th OG): Mitchel Field (Major Davenport Johnson)

8th Photo Section

Second Corps Area

Air Service Officer, Fort Jay, New York

9th Observation Group: Mitchel Field, New York (Major William N. Hensley, Jr.)

(tactical squadrons assigned directly to Corps Areas)
61st Service Squadron (Capt. Harrison W. Flickenger)

1st Division Air Service

5th Observation Squadron (9th OG): Mitchel Field (Capt. Harold McClelland)

14th Photo Section

Third Corps Area

Air Service Officer, Fort McHenry, Maryland

18th Airship Company (GHQR): Phillips Field, Maryland (1st Lt. James F. Powell)

2nd Wing headquarters: Langley Field, Virginia (Major Harold Geiger)

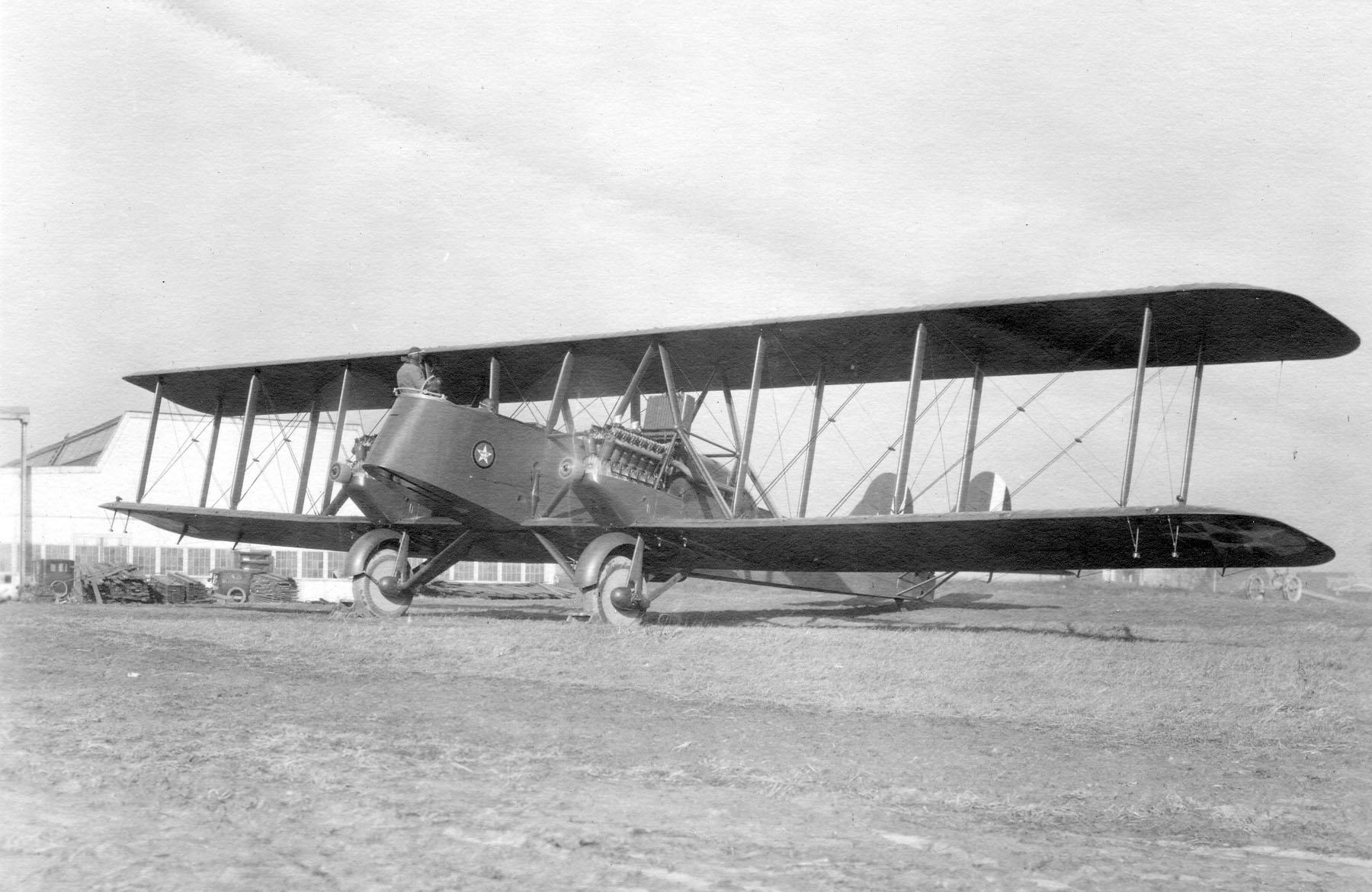
NBS-1 bomber equipped all eight bombardment squadrons in 1925

2nd Bombardment Group: Langley Field (Major John H. Pirie)

11th Bombardment Squadron (Capt. Early W. Duncan)
20th Bombardment Squadron (Capt. Willis H. Hale)
49th Bombardment Squadron: Phillips Field, Maryland (1st Lt. Bernard S. Thompson)
96th Bombardment Squadron (Capt. Edward C. Black)
59th Service Squadron (1st Lt. William A. Hayward)

2nd Photo Section

Divisional Air Service, 8th Division

99th Observation Squadron (9th OG): Bolling Field, Washington, D.C. (Capt. Clearton N. Reynolds)

3rd Photo Section

Fourth Corps Area

Air Service Officer, Fort McPherson, Georgia

Divisional Air Service, 4th Division

22nd Observation Squadron: Maxwell Field, Alabama (Major Roy S. Brown)

4th Photo Section

Fifth Corps Area

Air Service Officer, Fort Benjamin Harrison, Indiana

Divisional Air Service, 5th Division

88th Observation Squadron: Wilbur Wright Field, Ohio (Major Hugh J. Knerr)

7th Photo Section

Sixth Corps Area

Air Service Officer, Fort Sheridan, Illinois

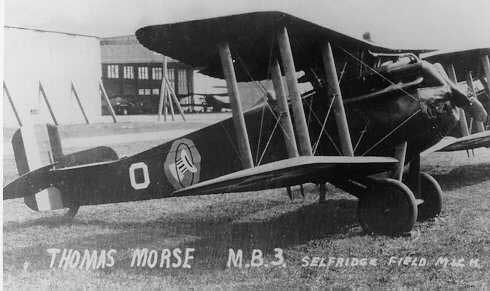
MB-3, 94th Pursuit Squadron. 1925 was its final year as the first-line fighter of the Air Service.

1st Pursuit Group: Selfridge Field, Michigan (Major Thomas G. Lanphier)

17th Pursuit Squadron (1st Lt. Oliver N. Broberg)
27th Pursuit Squadron (1st Lt. Alfred J. Lyon)
94th Pursuit Squadron (1st Lt. Frank O. Hunter)
95th Pursuit Squadron (1st Lt. Thomas K. Matthews)
57th Service Squadron (Capt. Theose E. Tillinghast)

21st Airship Group: Scott Field, Illinois (Major John A. Paegelow)

8th Airship Company (Capt. Charles M. Savage)
9th Airship Company (1st Lt. William A. Gray)
12th Airship Company (Capt. Warren B. Gates)
24th Airship Service Company (Capt. George S. Warren)

Divisional Air Service, 6th Division

15th Observation Squadron: Chanute Field, Illinois (Capt. Ernest Clark)

5th Photo Section

Seventh Corps Area

Air Service Officer, Fort Crook, Nebraska

Divisional Air Service, 7th Division

16th Observation Squadron: Marshall Field, Kansas (Major Benjamin G. Weir)

9th Photo Section

Eighth Corps Area

Air Service Officer, Fort Sam Houston, Texas (Note: In March 1925 this position was assigned to Col. Billy Mitchell following his demotion as a result of court martial conviction.)

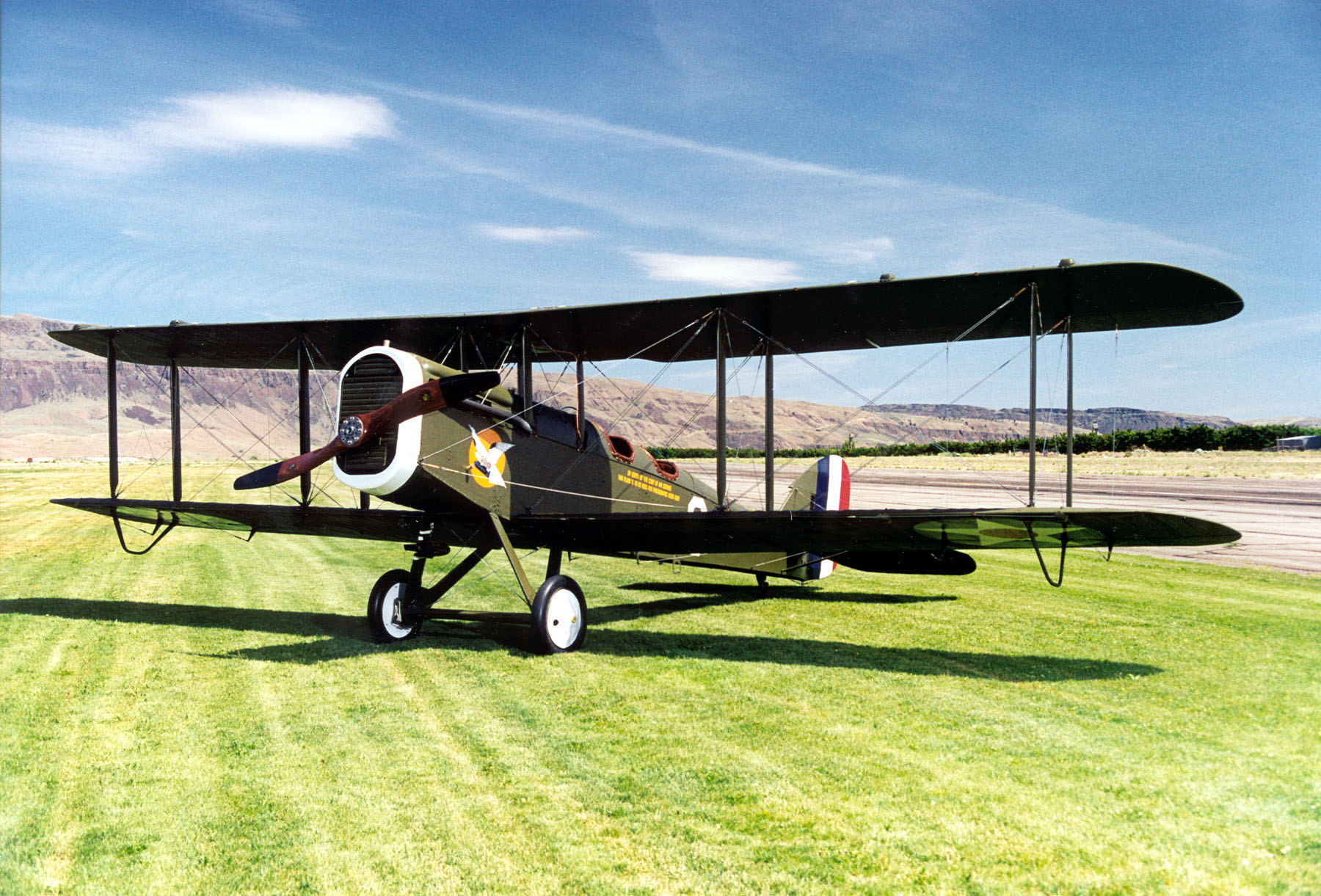
DH-4B, 12th Observation Squadron. An attack variant equipped the 3rd Group.

3rd Attack Group: Kelly Field, Texas (Major Harvey B.S. Burwell)

8th Attack Squadron (Capt. Joseph H. Davidson)
90th Attack Squadron (1st Lt. Walter R. Peck)
60th Service Squadron (1st Lt. Franklin O. Carroll)

2nd Division Air Service

12th Observation Squadron: Fort Bliss, Texas (Major Leo G. Heffernan)

1st Photo Section

Ninth Corps Area

Air Service Officer, Presidio of San Francisco, California

3rd Division Air Service

91st Observation Squadron: Crissy Field, California (Major Delos C. Emmons)

15th Photo Section

== Overseas departments ==
Hawaiian Department

Air Service Officer, Schofield Barracks, Hawaii

4th Observation Squadron: Wheeler Field, Hawaii (unknown)

5th Composite Group: Luke Field, Hawaii (Major Arnold N. Krogstad)

6th Pursuit Squadron (Capt. Hugh M. Elmendorf)
19th Pursuit Squadron (1st Lt. Roy A. Dunn)
23rd Bombardment Squadron (Capt. Karl H. Gorman)
72nd Bombardment Squadron (Capt. Richard J. Kirkpatrick)
65th Service Squadron (Capt. Donald P. Muse)

11th Photo Section

Panama Canal Department

Air Service Officer, Corazal, Canal Zone

6th Composite Group: France Field, C.Z. (Major Follett Bradley)

7th Observation Squadron (Capt. Charles E. Rust)
24th Pursuit Squadron (Capt. William E. Farthing)
25th Bombardment Squadron (1st Lt. Arthur K. Ladd)
63rd Service Squadron (1st Lt. Robin A. Day)

12th Photo Section

Philippine Department

Air Service Officer, Manila

4th Composite Group: Camp Nichols, P.I. (Major Charles L. Brown)

2nd Observation Squadron: Kindley Field, P.I. (Capt. Vernon L. Burge)
3rd Pursuit Squadron: Clark Field, P.I. (Major John C. McDonnell)
28th Bombardment Squadron (Capt. Rosenham Beam)
66th Service Squadron (1st Lt. Harry A. Dinger)

6th Photo Section

== Organized Reserve and National Guard ==
All Organized Reserve organizations and National Guard units assigned to the Air Service were manned by personnel residing in and allotted to the Corps Area in which they were located. Organizations above the group level were nonfunctional headquarters with no active command duties in peacetime, created as mobilization organizations without training responsibilities. Groups were headquarters personnel only, with squadrons nominally assigned over which they exercised limited control during training periods. Although assigned in plans to upper echelons, they were never organized as such components. To illustrate, on February 15, 1925:

- the 11th Wing Headquarters (Attack) was located in Seattle, Washington; allotted to the Ninth Corps Area; assigned to the Sixth Army; nominally commanded by Lt. Col. Frank H. Patterson; and had the 310th Pursuit Group (Missouri), 309th Attack Group (Illinois), and the 312th Observation Groups (California) assigned;
- the newly initiated 13th Wing Headquarters (Bombardment) was located in Baltimore, Maryland; allotted to the Third Corps Area; assigned to the General Headquarters Reserve (GHQR); commanded by Capt. Harold G. Slauson; and assigned the 347th Bombardment Group (Maryland, inactive) as a subordinate unit;
- the 312th Observation Group (of the 11th Wing, described above), was located at Crissy Field, San Francisco, California; allotted to the Ninth Corps Area; commanded by 1st Lt. Stanley C. Kerk; and had the 420th (Michigan), 434th (Arizona), 440th (California), and 441st (California) Observation Squadrons assigned; and
- the 36th Division Air Service was located at Ellington Field, Texas; allotted to the state of Texas (Eighth Corps Area); assigned to the 36th Division (VIII Corps); commanded by Major Bernard A. Law; and had the 111th Observation Squadron, the 111th Photo Section, and the 171st Air Intelligence Section assigned.

In June 1924 the Army created 31 school groups for the Organized Reserve and assigned them to the Zone of the Interior. Four were officially "organized" and remained so until September 1928, when all 31 were demobilized. Six of the other school groups were organized at some point during this period, four of which were on organized status on February 15, 1925.

By the Army's rules of unit organization, the headquarters of a National Guard division could not stand up until at least 75 percent of its subordinate units had been Federally recognized. By the end of 1924, 13 of the 18 National Guard division headquarters (under which divisional air services were organized) had been initiated, after which reduced Army budgets resulted in a two-year suspension of Federal recognition of new units.

National Guard aviation had 14 observation squadrons on February 15, 1925, in contrast to the Organized Reserve, which had 73 pursuit squadrons, 21 attack squadrons, and 18 observation squadrons assigned to its groups. However, in keeping with then-current legislation, National Guard units were allowed full manning (although at the time of mobilization for World War II the Guard as a whole was only at 50% strength), while O.R. units could have 100% of their authorized officer complements but no more than 33% of their enlisted strength, thus keeping most (including aviation squadrons) in a largely "on paper only" condition.

=== Organized Reserve ===
This list includes only reserve units above squadron level having an organized headquarters.

Field army air services
First Army (New Hampshire), Second Army (Ohio), Third Army (California), Fourth Army (New York), Fifth Army (Kentucky), Sixth Army (California)
Corps air services
II Corps (New York), VIII Corps (Texas), IX Corps (California), XI Corps (Massachusetts), XII Corps (New York), XIII Corps (Pennsylvania), XIV Corps (Georgia), XV Corps (Ohio), XVI Corps (Wisconsin), XVII Corps (Kansas), XVIII Corps (Texas), XIX Corps (California)
Divisional air services
77th, 78th, 79th, 80th, 81st, 82nd, 83rd, 84th, 85th, 86th, 87th, 88th, 89th, 90th, 91st, 94th, 95th, 96th, 97th, 98th, 99th, 100th, 101st, 102nd, 103rd, and 104th Divisions
Wing headquarters
1st Balloon Wing (Connecticut), 2d Balloon Wing (Oregon), 4th Airship Wing (Minnesota), 5th Airship Wing (Missouri), 6th Attack Wing (Pennsylvania), 7th Attack Wing (Ohio), 8th Attack Wing (Missouri), 9th Attack Wing (Illinois), 11th Attack Wing (Washington and California), 13th Bombardment Wing (Maryland), 17th Pursuit Wing (Minnesota)
Combat groups
302nd Pursuit Group (New York), 303rd Attack Group (New York), 304th Pursuit Group (Pennsylvania), 305th Attack Group (Virginia), 306th Pursuit Group (Ohio), 308th Pursuit Group (Illinois), 309th Attack Group (Illinois), 310th Pursuit Group (Missouri), 311th Pursuit Group (Texas), 312th Observation Group (California), 313th Observation Group (Massachusetts), 314th Pursuit Group (New York), 315th Observation Group (Pennsylvania), 316th Pursuit Group (Georgia), 317th Observation Group (Ohio), 318th Pursuit Group (Indiana), 319th Attack Group (Illinois), 320th Observation Group (Missouri), 321st Attack group (Oklahoma), 322nd Pursuit Group (California), 326th Pursuit Group (Pennsylvania), 327th Pursuit Group (Texas), 328th Attack Group (Washington), 329th Observation Group (California), 333rd Observation Group (Indiana), 345th Airship Group (Minnesota), 354th Pursuit Group (Minnesota), 355th Pursuit Group (Missouri), and 356th Pursuit Group (Minnesota)
Zone of Interior school groups
411th (Missouri), 412th (Kansas), 413th (Arkansas), 414th (Missouri), 415th (Minnesota), 416th (Missouri), 417th (Missouri), and 418th (Missouri) School Groups

=== National Guard ===
This list includes only Federally recognized National Guard units.

Divisional air services
26th, 27th, 28th, 29th, 30th, 31st, 34th, 36th, 38th, 40th, 41st, 43rd, and 45th Divisions
Squadrons
101st (Massachusetts), 102nd (New York), 103rd (Pennsylvania), 104th (Maryland), 105th (Tennessee), 106th (Alabama), 109th (Minnesota), 110th (Missouri), (Note: The 110th Observation Squadron was the only Federally recognized National Guard aviation unit that operated without a divisional air service as a higher echelon between 1923 and 1929, when divisional aviation services were no longer utilized.) 111th (Texas), 113th (Indiana), 115th (California), 116th (Washington), 118th (Connecticut), and 120th (Colorado) Observation Squadrons. Except as noted, these observation squadrons were the operational units of the National Guard divisional air services listed above, in the same order.

== Notes ==
Footnotes

Citations
