= John Fellows Akers =

American businessman (1934–2014)

- Born: December 28, 1934
- Died: August 22, 2014 (aged 79); Boston, Massachusetts, U.S.
- Education: Yale University
- Occupation: Businessman

John Fellows Akers (December 28, 1934 – August 22, 2014) was an American businessman. He was president (1983–1989), chief executive officer (1985–1993) and chairman (1986–1993) of IBM.

== Education ==
Akers attended Yale University, and while there joined Delta Kappa Epsilon (Phi chapter). He played on the hockey team and received a degree in business.

== IBM ==
Akers joined IBM in 1960 after serving in the Navy as a jet pilot.

Akers said in 2010 “We were very square. We wore the blue suits, white shirts with button-down collars, striped ties, fedoras and wingtip shoes. The customers felt they could count on us.”

Akers became CEO in 1985. He benefitted from the support of one of his predecessors, Frank Cary. In 1989, a young Sam Palmisano was appointed as Aker's assistant; decades later Palmisano would be chairman and CEO. Akers was chief executive during IBM's decline in the mid-1980s and early 1990s. Apple Inc. founder Steve Jobs described Akers as "smart, eloquent, fantastic salesperson, but he didn’t know anything about product.”

Akers was credited with simplifying the company's bureaucracy to focus more on profits. On January 29, 1988, in a sweeping restructuring intended to reverse three years of disappointing performance, Akers created five new, highly autonomous organizations responsible for all of the company's innovation, design, and manufacturing. The moves were intended to greatly decentralize the company, which had been seen as bloated and unable to keep up with the competition and give significantly more responsibility to a younger generation of managers, while significantly reducing the role of the company's Armonk, N.Y., headquarters in the day-to-day operations. Under the plan, thousands of employees had to switch jobs or find themselves working for new managers. Akers' vision was to autonomize each division into "Baby Blues" with the aim of spinning them off from "Big Blue".

Akers also presided over a major downsizing of IBM's workforce, cutting down from 407,000 to 360,000 by the end of 1991. The company had previously had a lifetime employment policy but successive voluntary buyouts and the first-ever layoff in March 1993, caused a morale crisis. Akers also closed ten plants and trimmed manufacturing capacity by forty percent.

=== Retirement ===
On January 26, 1993, Akers was forced to announce his resignation, after several months of IBM insisting that it had full confidence in his leadership. The company had posted a $5 billion annual loss. The dividend was also slashed from $1.21 to 54 cents, after the company had failed to make enough profit to cover its dividend payments for eight business quarters. IBM president Jack Kuehler was shifted to the post of vice-chairman, while finance director Frank Metz was also ousted. Paul Rizzo, a rival with Akers for the CEO position back in 1985 who had retired in 1987 was restored to the post of vice-chairman and appointed finance director. Akers remained as chief executive for three months while a committee of directors chose a successor, long speculated to be an outsider. Akers retired as chairman and CEO of IBM on April 1, 1993. He was succeeded in both positions by Gerstner, the first CEO in IBM's history to attain the position from outside the company.

The management coup was mounted by longtime IBM director Jim Burke, who organized secret meetings between Rizzo and outsider Louis V. Gerstner, Jr. to examine the company's problems. It was also speculated that several entities were dissatisfied with losing their power on the board of directors and the declining stock price, including the banks which were once IBM's largest shareholders, as well as Aker's predecessors as CEO, John Opel and Frank Cary. The company's difficulties weren't caused by Akers alone, as some suggested that he was merely doing what he had been "programmed" to do by an outdated "IBM system", while a complacent board of directors was also blamed.

== Other business roles ==
Akers was on the board of directors of Lehman Brothers when it filed for bankruptcy.

== Personal ==
Akers died of a stroke at age 79 in Boston, Massachusetts on August 22, 2014.

Business positions
| Preceded by John Opel | CEO of IBM; 1985–1993 | Succeeded by Louis V. Gerstner, Jr. |
