= Ellsworth Hunt Augustus =

10th President of BSA

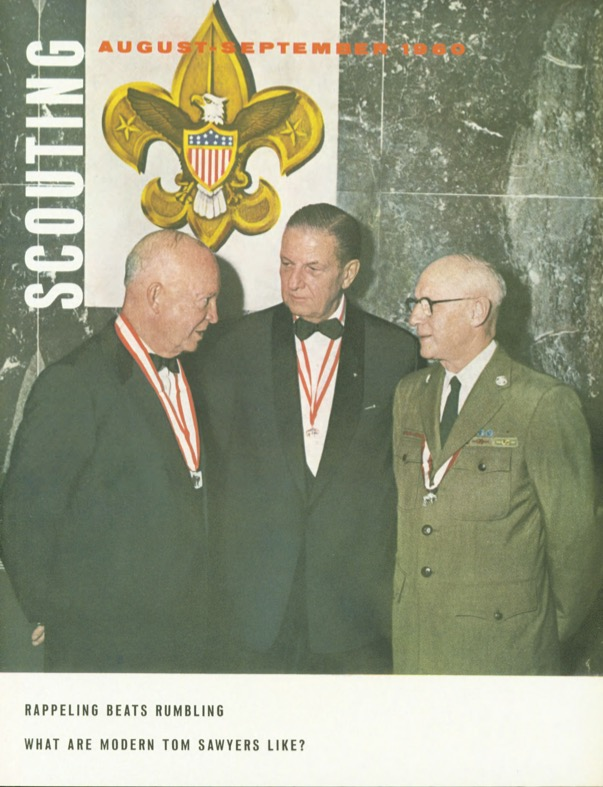
- President Dwight Eisenhower, BSA President Ellsworth Augustus, and Chief Scout Executive Arthur A. Shuck at the 1960 National Annual Meeting

Tenth National President of the Boy Scouts of America
- In office 1959–1964
- Preceded by: Kenneth K. Bechtel
- Succeeded by: Thomas J. Watson Jr.

Personal details
- Born: 23 November 1897 Chicago, Illinois
- Died: 16 May 1964 Cleveland, Ohio
- Resting place: Lakeview Cemetery, Cleveland, Ohio
- Education: University School in Cleveland, Yale University
- Known for: Council, Regional, and National President, Boy Scouts of America

Ellsworth Hunt "Gus" Augustus was an American businessman, banker, investor, industrialist, serviceman, athlete, and welfare volunteer from Cleveland, Ohio. He served the Boy Scouts of America locally as the president of the Greater Cleveland Council, regionally as the chairman of Region 4 (Ohio, West Virginia, and Kentucky), and nationally as its tenth National president. He lived in Waite Hill, Ohio, with his wife Elizabeth Good "Betty" Augustus, until his death in May 1964. Augustus and his wife had four children, Daneen, Albert Anthony Augustus II, Elizabeth (Betsy), and Margaret (Peggy).

== Biography ==
Augustus was born on November 23, 1897, in Chicago, Illinois. Augustus graduated from University School in 1915, and in 1962, he was named its alumnus of the year. He attended Yale University from 1915-1917 where he played baseball and hockey.

Augustus, a seven-time winner of the Cleveland amateur golf title between 1918 and 1930, once beat Bobby Jones at a charity golf event. He was characterized in the June 1920 issue of Vanity Fair magazine as being the country's most powerful driver off the tee, demonstrating his golf swing in a series of time lapse photos.

In World War I, Augustus served as a sergeant in the 158th Depot Brigade at Camp Sherman. He served for four more years during World War II as a commander in the US Navy. He was the executive officer on the troop ship USS West Point, which was converted from the ocean liner SS America. It carried nearly 500,000 troops. For his work on damage-control systems, he was awarded the Secretary of the Navy's Commendation Medal.

In 1950, Augustus was appointed as the Cuyahoga County coordinator of Civil Defense at the request of Cleveland Mayor Thomas A. Burke and the county commissioners. Neither Augustus nor his staff had much experience with civil defense, and the federal government provided minimal guidance. Using his own money and contributions from friends, they developed a civil defense organization and plans for a county-wide program that called for volunteers to help with the county's defense. Augustus hoped to train 375,000 people (one member from each family in Cuyahoga County) in first aid, 30,000-40,000 air raid wardens, 5,000 auxiliary police officers, and 3,000 auxiliary firemen. Cleveland school officials in February 1951 sent parents letters describing the schools' civil defense efforts. Some schools taught their students "Duck and Cover".

Augustus was a trustee of the Education Research Council of Cleveland and active in other groups such as the Welfare Federation of Cleveland, the Vocational Guidance and Rehabilitation Services, and the Association for the Crippled and Disabled. He was awarded a plaque by the Institute of Fiscal and Political Education for his work against authoritarianism in 1959 and the Community Chest Distinguished Service Award in 1963.

== Scouting ==
Augustus was not a Scout as a boy. (Scouting had its genesis in America in 1910, the year Augustus turned 13.) When asked about his interest in Scouting, he was quoted as saying:

Younger people are going to be around longer and I'd rather help them than try to repair the older ones.

Augustus began his Scouting service in 1940 and served as vice president (1941–1946) and president (1947–1953) of the Greater Cleveland Council. He joined the National Executive Board in 1950 serving as chairman of Region 4 from 1956 to 1959. He received the Silver Beaver and Silver Antelope awards in 1951 and the Silver Buffalo Award in 1954. In 1957, he chaired the campaign to raise 1.1 million dollars, $750,000 for camps, and $250,000 to build a new council office, which is still in use today. In 1960, he was the national chair of the Golden Jubilee celebration for the fiftieth anniversary of the founding of the BSA. In 1964, Catholic Scouting Leaders awarded Augustus with its highest honor, the Saint George Award. Augustus was an honorary brother of Alpha Phi Omega.

Augustus was elected president of the Boy Scouts of America in 1959 and served for five one-year terms until his death in 1964. His service to the Scout movement included participating in the 11th World Scout Jamboree in 1963 at Marathon, Greece, and 19th World Conference on the Isle of Rhodes. During 1964, he made an official visit to the Far East Council of the Boy Scouts of America with headquarters in Tokyo, Japan, and conferred with leaders of Scout associations in Taiwan, Korea, and Japan, where he received the highest distinction of the Scout Association of Japan, the Golden Pheasant Award.

== Legacy ==
In 1967, the Boy Scouts of America opened the Ellsworth H. Augustus International Scout House on the grounds of the former national office in North Brunswick, New Jersey, until closing in 1979 with the move of the office to Irving, Texas. Sub camp 20 at the 2001 National Scout Jamboree was named in his honor.

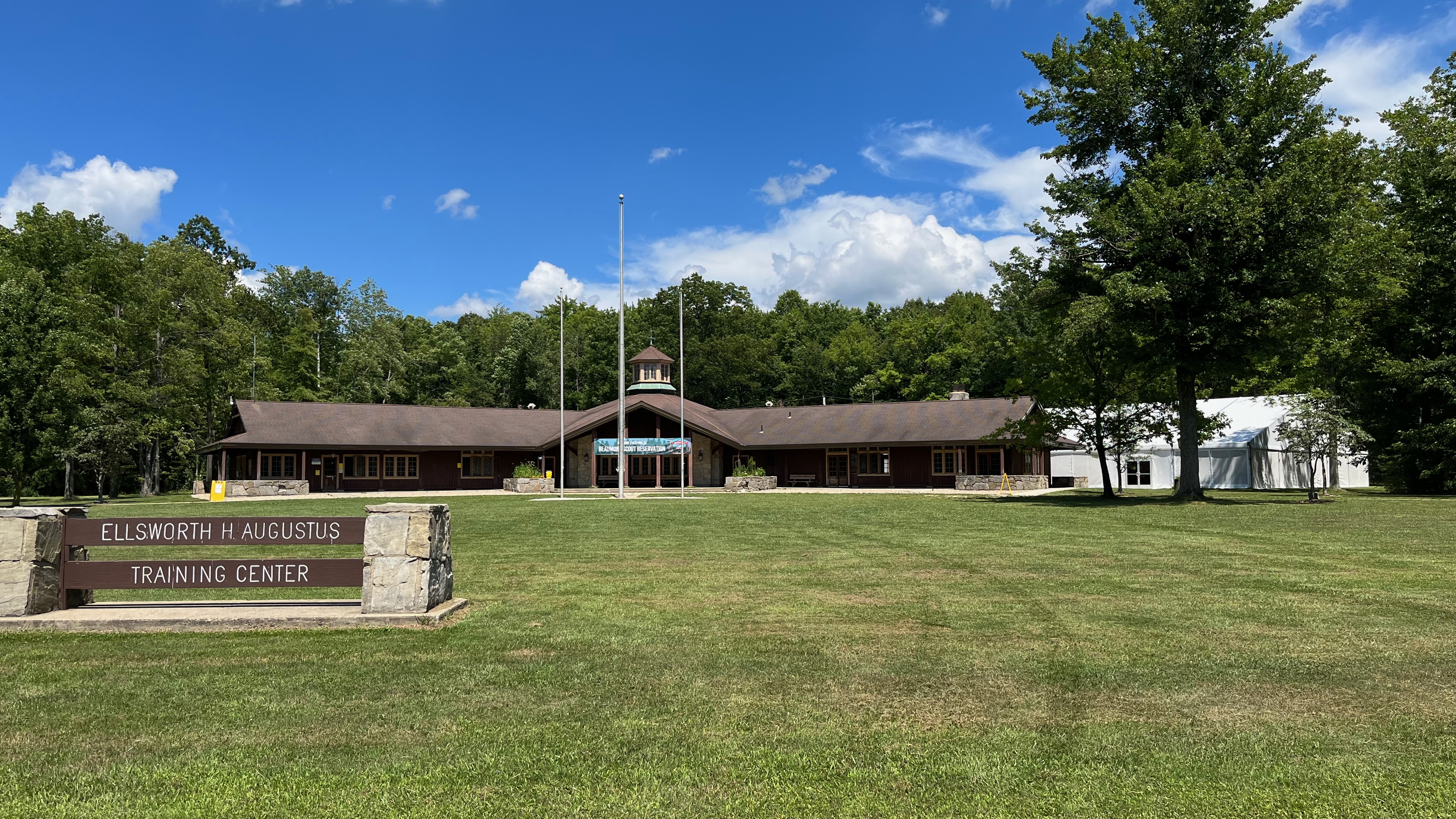
Ellsworth H. Augustus Center at Camp Beaumont

The headquarters at Lake Erie Council's (formerly Greater Cleveland Council's) Camp Beaumont is named after Augustus. Construction began in 1966, and the center opened in February 1967. Elizabeth Augustus, Augustus' widow, funded the construction of the center and the eight cottages (now called family cabins) nearby. It is variously known as the Augustus Dining Hall, Augustus Training Center, and (along with the grounds and surrounding structures) the Augustus Complex. It includes a dining hall, training center, and other facilities.

Boy Scouts of America
Preceded by Kenneth K. Bechtel	National president 1959–1964	Succeeded by Thomas J. Watson, Jr.
