= Smarter Planet =

Corporate initiative by IBM

Logo

Smarter Planet is a corporate initiative of the information technology company IBM. The initiative was formed to encourage the ideas of business, government, and civil society leaders worldwide towards their path of achieving economic growth, near-term efficiency, sustainable development, and societal progress. Examples of smarter systems include smart grids, water management systems, solutions to traffic congestion problems, greener buildings, IBM's goal and strategy is to use the capacity of these technology and process management capabilities and, outside the realm of technology, to advocate for policy decisions that, according to the IBM's management, could "make the planet smarter.

== History ==
Smarter Planet was officially formed in November 2008, when IBM's Chairman, CEO, and President Sam Palmisano at the Council on Foreign Relations presented a new agenda for building a "smarter planet". In his speech, he emphasized how the world's systems and industries are becoming more interconnected and intelligent, and that leaders and citizens can take advantage of this state of affairs to improve these systems and industries. In January 2010, Sam Palmisano gave a follow-up speech to the Chatham House called the "Decade of Smart". He highlighted dozens of initiatives in which leaders created smarter systems to solve the planet's most pressing problems. The speech aimed to inspire others to follow the leads of these innovators by helping to create a smarter planet.

Smarter Planet's goal is to use the technology and intelligent systems in order to create smarter power grids, food systems, water, healthcare, and traffic systems.

== Advertising campaign ==
In 2008 and 2009, IBM ran a series of marketing campaigns in newspapers such as The New York Times and The Wall Street Journal. Each of these "op-ads" featured an essay about a system or industry that IBM claims can be made "smarter" through the application of technology.

In January 2010, a display at Epcot's Innoventions was installed. Its goal is to showcase how using technology can solve world problems "from reducing road traffic and city crime to improving food safety and local water supplies." A video that plays on a 12-foot globe in the exhibit was created by Christian Matts and edited by Ben Suenaga. Smarter Planet's advertising campaign is also supporting TED (Technology, Entertainment, Design) Talks.

== Smarter cities ==
In 2009, IBM launched the Smarter Cities Challenge. Its goal is to aid major cities worldwide to run more efficiently, save money and resources, and improve the quality of life for their citizens.

To date, Smarter Cities Challenge serves thousands of cities around the world in all areas of management including public safety, health and human services, education, infrastructure, energy, water, and environmental. IBM Smarter cities also include citizen participation through People4SmarterCities.com, so they can be part of the technological advances transforming their cities.

Examples of major cities around the world using IBM Smarter Cities technology:

1. In 2015, Surat, India implemented an emergency response solution using IBM Technology to be an advanced technological city.
2. In 2010, Peterborough, UK, visualised the city systems using data to accelerate collaboration and better decision making.
3. In 2013, New Taipei City Police, implemented an IBM solution to enhance police productivity and ensuring public safety.
4. In 2013, Tucson, Arizona, implemented a water conservation solution with IBM focused on smart metering and water leak detection.
5. In 2013, Digital Delta transformed Dutch water management system using Big Data.

== See also ==
- CeNSE (similar project by HP)
