= John R. Opel =

American businessman

- Born: John Roberts Opel; January 5, 1925; Kansas City, Missouri, U.S.
- Died: November 3, 2011 (aged 86); Fort Myers, Florida, U.S.
- Education: University of Chicago
- Known for: Former CEO and chairman of IBM

John Roberts Opel (January 5, 1925 – November 3, 2011) was an American computer businessman. He was the president of IBM from 1974 to1985. He was the chief executive officer (CEO) of IBM from 1981 to 1985, and chairman from 1983 to 1986.

== Early life and education ==
Born in Kansas City, Missouri, Opel grew up in Jefferson City, Missouri, where his father owned a hardware store. He majored in English at Westminster College in Fulton, Missouri. He then fought in the Philippines and Okinawa in World War II and earned an MBA degree from the University of Chicago in 1949.

== Career ==
Upon graduation, Opel had two job offers, one to rewrite economics textbooks, and the other to take over his father's hardware business. While taking a fishing trip with his father and a family friend who worked for IBM, he was offered a third job as a salesman in central Missouri, and accepted.

In 1959, Opel became executive assistant to IBM CEO Thomas J. Watson Jr., after which he rose rapidly, taking positions in manufacturing and public relations and other departments, and managed the introduction of the IBM System/360 mainframe computer in 1964. In 1974, he was elected president. In 1981, he became the CEO of IBM, then its chairman.

Under his leadership, IBM developed and launched the first IBM personal computer, forever changing the face of computing and IBM.

== Death ==
A former longtime resident of Chappaqua, New York, Opel died at the age of 86 at his Fort Myers, Florida, home in 2011.

Business positions
Preceded by Frank T. Cary	CEO of IBM; 1981–1985	Succeeded by John F. Akers
