= Elizabeth Augustus Whitehead =

American classical archaeologist

Elizabeth Grace Augustus Whitehead (1928–1983) was an American classical archaeologist and philanthropist. She was the general secretary of the Archaeological Institute of America (AIA) between 1971 and 1978 and president of the board of the American School of Classical Studies at Athens (ASCSA) from 1976 until her death in 1983.

== Early life and education ==
Elizabeth Grace Augustus was born in Willougby, Ohio, on June 17, 1928. Her father was Ellsworth Hunt Augustus (1887–1964), a businessman and national president of the Boy Scouts of America, and her mother was Elizabeth Good Augustus. She attended Hathaway Brown School and Sarah Lawrence College.

She married Curtis Jones in 1952 and moved to Bucks County, Pennsylvania. They had three children: Dylan Jones, Sydney Jones and Evan Jones.

== Archaeological career ==
Whitehead's interest in archaeology began at the age of 33, on a family tour of Greece, where her father was attending a Scout Jamboree. They were accompanied by a guide, Constantine Nicoloudis, whose deep knowledge of the country's history and antiquities made the trip "nothing less than a first-rate illustrated course in classical archaeology."

On her arrival back in the United States, Whitehead immediately applied to study classical archaeology at the University of Pennsylvania. Enrolling in 1963, she studied primarily under Rodney Young, and worked on his excavations at Gordion. She also joined an expedition to locate ancient Thurii in Italy. Her studies covered a range of topics and she was a regular participant in seminars at both Penn and Bryn Mawr College. By 1969, she had completed the requirements for a PhD in classical archaeology, but never submitted a dissertation. Her biographer, Doreen Spitzer, speculated that, while Whitehead remained interested and committed to the discipline, her affluent background left her with little reason to pursue an academic career. The expectations of a housewife and mother-of-three at the time also drastically reduced the time she could devote to her studies, as did her divorce from Jones in 1968.

=== Archaeological Institute of America and American School at Athens ===
In 1969, Whitehead married Edwin C. "Jack" Whitehead, a businessman, philanthropist, and founder of the Whitehead Institute. The couple settled in Greenwich, Connecticut, along with Elizabeth's three children and Jack's five from previous marriages. This busy home life put an end to Whitehead's studies at Penn. However, in 1971, she was drawn back into archaeology when her former teacher Rodney Young asked her to take the position of general secretary of the Archaeological Institute of America (AIA). Young was then the president of the AIA, an organization that promotes the public understanding of archaeology, primarily through its more than one hundred local societies. As general secretary, Whitehead ran the national office in New York. At the beginning of her tenure it was largely concerned with classical archaeology; Whitehead broadened its focus to include the archaeology of the Americas and, after establishing links with archaeological organizations in China, the archaeology of East Asia. She left her position at the AIA in 1978 but was elected an honorary fellow for life.

Whitehead was invited to become a trustee of the American School of Classical Studies at Athens (ASCSA) in 1972, and was appointed the president of the board in 1976. She initiated a major fundraising campaign and was successful in raising more than $6 million for the school, including a large donation from her own funds. She also began the publication of an annual Newsletter, worked to maintain cordial relations between the ASCSA and archaeological authorities in Greece, and improved the school's public exposure.

=== Other activities ===
In addition to her positions at the AIA and ASCSA, Whitehead supported a number of other institutions, many concerned with archaeology, through donations and by serving as a trustee. In 1968, she met George Bass and helped him found the Institute of Nautical Archaeology. She was also a trustee of her alma mater Sarah Lawrence College from 1976 to 1980, a member of the executive board of the Institute for Advanced Study in Princeton, and a board member of her husband's Whitehead Institute.

== Death and legacy ==
Whitehead suffered from pulmonary fibrosis from the mid-1970s. She died of the disease on August 3, 1983. She bequeathed a large collection of books to the ASCSA library, as well as an endowment for a visiting professorship. Her husband, who became a trustee after her death, later doubled the endowment, creating two Elizabeth A. Whitehead Visiting Professor positions at the ASCSA.

The library of the Whitehead Institute for Biomedical Research is named for her.
