= CeNSE =

CeNSE or the Central Nervous System of the Earth, is a project by Hewlett-Packard and others to place sensors everywhere.

Wireless accelerometers and other types of sensors transmit data at the speed of light (taking into account the delay on networks). The technology could be used to build an earthquake warning system; in 2010, HP sold the technology to Shell for hydrocarbon exploration.

== See also ==
- Smarter Planet (similar project by IBM)
