= Arvind Krishna =

Indian American business executive (born 1962)

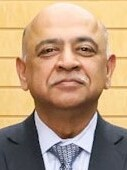
- Krishna in 2025
- Born: November 23, 1962 (age 63); West Godavari, Andhra Pradesh, India
- Education: Indian Institute of Technology Kanpur (BTech); University of Illinois Urbana–Champaign (PhD)
- Title: Chairman & CEO, IBM
- Predecessor: Ginni Rometty

Arvind Krishna (born November 23, 1962) is an Indian-American business executive, and the chairman and CEO of IBM. He has been CEO of IBM since April 2020 and chairman since January 2021. Krishna began his career at IBM in 1990, at its Thomas J. Watson Research Center, and was promoted to senior vice president in 2015, managing IBM Cloud & Cognitive Software and IBM Research divisions. He was a principal architect of the acquisition of Red Hat, the largest acquisition the company's history.

== Early life and education ==
Krishna was born in a Telugu family in West Godavari District, Andhra Pradesh, India. His father, Major General Vinod Krishna, was an army officer who served in the Indian Army and his mother, Aarathi Krishna, worked for the welfare of Army widows. Krishna studied at Stanes Anglo Indian Higher Secondary School in Coonoor, Tamil Nadu, and at St Joseph's Academy, Dehradun.

Krishna received a Bachelor of Technology degree in electrical engineering from Indian Institute of Technology, Kanpur in 1985 and a Doctor of Philosophy in electrical engineering from the University of Illinois Urbana-Champaign in 1991.

== Career ==
=== Professional career ===
Krishna joined IBM's Thomas J. Watson Research Center in 1990, and continued in Watson Research for 18 years until 2009. Thereafter, he held a General Manager role in Information management software and systems and technology group of IBM. In 2015, he was promoted to senior vice president of IBM Research. He later became senior vice president of IBM's cloud and cognitive software division.

Krishna also led the building and expansion of new markets for IBM in artificial intelligence, cloud, quantum computing, and blockchain technology. He was a driving force behind IBM's $34 billion acquisition of Red Hat, which closed in July 2019.

He was appointed IBM's CEO in January 2020, effective April 6, 2020, succeeding Ginni Rometty who was CEO since 2012. He joined Satya Nadella, Shantanu Narayen, and Sundar Pichai as an Indian-American CEO of a major United States technology company. In 2021, he was named by CRN as the year's "Most Influential Executive".

Krishna is a member of The Business Council.

=== Research ===
Krishna has co-authored 15 patents, has been the editor of IEEE and ACM journals, and has published extensively in technical journals.

== Personal life ==
Krishna is married and has two children. He lives in Connecticut.

== See also ==
- Indians in the New York City metropolitan area

Business positions
| Preceded by Ginni Rometty | CEO of IBM; 2020–present | Succeeded by |
| Preceded by Ginni Rometty | Executive Chairman of IBM; 2020–present | Succeeded by |
