= Thomas J. Watson Jr. =

American businessman and diplomat (1914–1993)

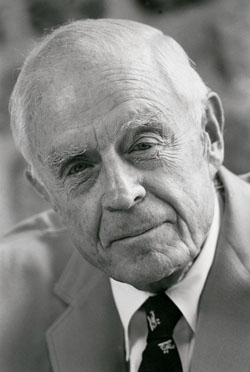
- c. 1980

United States Ambassador to the Soviet Union
- In office October 29, 1979 – January 15, 1981
- President: Jimmy Carter
- Preceded by: Malcolm Toon
- Succeeded by: Arthur A. Hartman

11th President of Boy Scouts of America
- In office 1964–1968
- Preceded by: Ellsworth Hunt Augustus
- Succeeded by: Irving Feist

President of International Business Machines Corporation
- In office 1952–1971
- Preceded by: Thomas J. Watson Sr.
- Succeeded by: Office vacant*

Personal details
- Born: Thomas John Watson Jr. January 14, 1914 Dayton, Ohio, U.S.
- Died: December 31, 1993 (aged 79) Greenwich, Connecticut, U.S.
- Spouse: Olive Cawley
- Children: Thomas John Watson III; Jeanette Watson; Olive F. Watson; Lucinda Watson; Susan Watson; Helen Watson
- Parent(s): Thomas J. Watson; Jeanette M. Kittredge
- Education: Brown University
- Occupation: Business

Thomas John Watson Jr. (January 14, 1914 – December 31, 1993) was an American businessman, diplomat, Army Air Forces pilot, and philanthropist. The son of IBM Corporation founder Thomas J. Watson, he was the second IBM president (1952–71), the 11th national president of the Boy Scouts of America (1964–68) and served on the World Scout Committee (1965-1971), and the 16th United States Ambassador to the Soviet Union (1979–81). He received many honors during his lifetime, including being awarded the Presidential Medal of Freedom by Lyndon B. Johnson in 1964. Fortune called him "the greatest capitalist in history" and Time listed him as one of "100 most influential people of the 20th century".

== Early life ==
Thomas Watson Jr. was born on January 14, 1914, just before his father, Thomas J. Watson, was dismissed from his job at cash register company NCR – an act which subsequently drove Watson Sr., to founding the largest and most profitable digital computer manufacturer in the world, IBM Corporation. Two sisters followed Thomas Jr., Jane and Helen, before a final child, Arthur Kittredge Watson, was born.

Watson Jr. was raised in the Short Hills section of Millburn, New Jersey.

Both sons were immersed in IBM from a very early age. He was taken on plant inspections – his first memory of such a visit (to the Dayton, Ohio factory) was at the age of five – and business tours to Europe and made appearances at annual gatherings for the company's elite sales representatives, the IBM Hundred Per Cent Club, even before he was old enough to attend school.

At home his father's discipline was erratic and often harsh. Around the time he was thirteen, Watson suffered from clinical depression.

Talking to a reporter in 1974, Watson described his relationship with his father; "My father and I had terrible fights ... He seemed like a blanket that covered everything. I really wanted to beat him but also make him proud of me." But this relationship was not all negative: "I really enjoyed the ten years (working) with him". In his book he says; "I was so intimately entwined with my father. I had a compelling desire, maybe out of honor for the old gentleman, maybe out of sheer cussedness, to prove to the world that I could excel in the same way that he did."

Watson's Brown University yearbook photo, 1937

Watson attended the Hun School of Princeton in Princeton, New Jersey. He claimed in his autobiography that as a child he had a "strange defect in his vision" that made written words appear to fall off the page when he tried to read them. As a result, Watson struggled in school, and he acknowledged that Brown University reluctantly admitted him as a favor to his father. He graduated with a business degree in 1937.

After graduating, Watson became a salesman for IBM but had little interest in the job. The turning point was his service as a pilot in the Army Air Forces during World War II. His brother "Dick" (Arthur) Watson had dropped out of Yale. Watson became a lieutenant colonel, tasked with flying military commanders. Tom Jr. later admitted to journalists that the one career he would have liked to follow was an airline pilot. Piloting came easily to him and for the first time, he had confidence in his abilities. Toward the end of his service, Watson worked for Major General Follett Bradley, who suggested that he should try to follow his father at IBM. Watson regularly flew Bradley, the director of lend-lease programs to the Soviet Union, to Moscow during the war. On these trips, he learned Russian, which would later serve him well as the American Ambassador to the Soviet Union. Watson and Bradley were instrumental in establishing the ALSIB-Northwest Staging Route to send military aircraft from the United States to the Soviet Union.

Watson returned to IBM at the beginning of 1946. He was promoted to be a vice president just six months later and was promoted to the board just four months after that. He became Executive Vice-president in 1949.

== IBM president ==
Watson became president of IBM in 1952 and was named as the company's CEO shortly before the death of his father, Watson Sr., in 1956. Up to this time IBM was dedicated to electromechanical punched card systems for its commercial products. Watson Sr. had repeatedly rejected electronic computers as overpriced and unreliable, except for one-of-a-kind projects such as the IBM SSEC. Tom Jr. took the company in a new direction, hiring electrical engineers by the hundreds and putting them to work designing mainframe computers. Many of IBM's technical experts also did not think computer products were practical since there were only about a dozen computers in the entire world at the time. Even the supporters of the new technology underestimated the potential. Cuthbert Hurd, brought in from the Atomic Energy Commission's Oak Ridge National Laboratory to determine if there was a market, predicted "... he could find customers for as many as thirty machines."

Even so, until the late 1950s the custom-built US Air Force SAGE computerized tracking system accounted for more than half of IBM's computer sales. The company made little profit on these sales but, as Tom Jr. said "It enabled us to build highly automated factories ahead of anybody else, and to train thousands of new workers in electronics."

Tom Jr.'s decision was justified; in the longer term, it redirected IBM to its later position dominating the computer market. Even in the short term it paid off; for revenues more than tripled in six years, from $214.9 million in 1950 to $734.3 million in 1956. This dramatic rate of growth almost matched the wartime years; a better than 30% compound growth rate that Tom Jr. maintained for much of the twenty years of his leadership of IBM. It was a record even better than that of his father.

Despite the presence of his son, Thomas Sr. kept a firm grip on the reins until 1955. Tom Jr. described the position of his father as "He wanted to make me head of IBM, but he didn't like sharing the limelight."

Tom Jr. took over effective control in a dramatic moment; though the formal handover took place a few months later. The occasion was signing the Consent Decree which was offered by the government after its latest anti-trust investigation. Tom Jr. saw that the Consent Decree, which sought to strip IBM of half its card-making capacity, was largely irrelevant since the future was in computers rather than cards. There was another condition: IBM had to sell machines outright as well as lease them. This had repercussions in the late 1960s when leasing companies recognized the financing loophole that it created.

Behind this decision was another: spending more on research and development. IBM was only spending 3% on research and development at that time when other high technology companies were spending between 6% and 9%. Tom Jr. learned the lesson, and thereafter – at least until the 1990s (when, even then, Louis V. Gerstner Jr. only dropped it to 6%) – IBM consistently spent 9%. By comparison, the equivalent figure for Japan was 5.1%, though its high technology companies exceeded even the IBM level, with the 1983 spending for Canon being 14.6% and that for NEC being 13.0%.

This training program was to take him, over the next five years, through many of IBM's operating groups. Tom Jr. believed his most important influence was Albert Lynn Williams, a CPA, who became president of IBM in 1961. Although the initiative, and as such much of the credit for the birth of the information revolution, must go to Tom Jr., considerable courage was also displayed by his then aging father who, despite his long commitment to internal funding, backed his son to the hilt; reportedly with the words "It is harder to keep a business great than it is to build it."

In 1968, Tom Jr. fired computer scientist Lynn Conway because he feared the news of her gender transition would affect the company's reputation.

== Research and development ==
Prior to his time, IBM had primarily emphasized the sales organization, with a reasonable range of products. Tom Watson Jr., however, promoted a research and development structure.

The first result of this was the IBM 7030 Stretch program to develop a transistorized "supercomputer"; it failed to meet its price and performance goals, at a reported cost of $20 million. Although embarrassing in terms of the rumors that drifted to the outside world, it would not however be the last IBM computer series to be terminated and the cost was small in IBM's terms; and the experience gained was invaluable.

The three computer families that eventually emerged from 1958 onwards comprised the IBM 7070 and IBM 7090 for large government business and large businesses, the IBM 1620 for smaller customers in the scientific community, and the IBM 1401 for commercial use by smaller organizations. Despite the fact that many observers believed that Tom Jr was frittering away the resources his father had built up, these new ranges were remarkably successful, doubling IBM's sales once more over the six years from 1958 ($1.17 billion) to 1964 ($2.31 billion), maintaining IBM's dramatic growth rate virtually undiminished at approaching 30% compound. The effect was that IBM had become independent of outside funding.

In the early 1960s he oversaw the IBM System/360 project, which produced an entire line of computers that ran the same software and used the same peripherals. Since the 360 line was incompatible with IBM's previous products, it represented an enormous risk for the company. Despite delays in shipment, the products were well-received following their launch in 1964 and what Fortune magazine called "IBM's $5 Billion Gamble," in the end, paid off.

== Organizational structures ==
Perhaps Watson's most enduring contribution to IBM was its organizational structure, since new products, no matter how successful, carry a company for at most a few years. In 1956, in a move that became a bi-annual event, he reorganized IBM on divisional lines, to give a decentralized organization, with five major divisions in the US. The new structure comprised:

1. Data Processing Division – selling to (and servicing) commercial customers
2. Federal Systems Division – selling to (and servicing) the US government
3. Systems Manufacturing Division
4. Components Manufacturing Division
5. Research Division

Smaller units were Electric Typewriter, IBM World Trade, Service Bureau Corporation, Supplies Division; and Time Division (sold off in 1958). Watson said "We had a superb sales organization but lacked expert management organization in almost everything else". His goal was to redirect IBM to absorb the shocks of change, including change from its own innovation.

He introduced the terminology "line and staff". In his words: "By the mid-'50s just about every big corporation had adopted the so-called staff-and-line structure. It was modeled on military organizations going back to the Prussian army in Napoleonic times." His organization "... provided IBM executives with the clearest possible goals. Each operating man was judged strictly on his unit's results, and each staff man on his effort toward making IBM the world leader in his specialty."

The final element of formal organizational change was the isolation of headquarters staff in Armonk, New York. This was said by him to be in order to be near his family in Connecticut.

His first book in 1963 discussed his management philosophy.

== Honors ==
Watson received the Silver Buffalo Award from the Boy Scouts of America in 1955 for his service to youth. He was the national president of the BSA from 1964 to 1968. His father had also served on the national executive board and was International Commissioner in the 1940s.

Lyndon B. Johnson in September 1964 awarded Watson the Presidential Medal of Freedom, the highest award a U.S. president can bestow on a civilian.

Watson was inducted into the Junior Achievement U.S. Business Hall of Fame in 1976. He was awarded the Vermilye Medal in 1967. In 1987 Fortune magazine hailed Watson on its cover as "the greatest capitalist in history". In 1998 he was included on TIME Magazine's 100 most influential people of the 20th century.

== Retirement ==
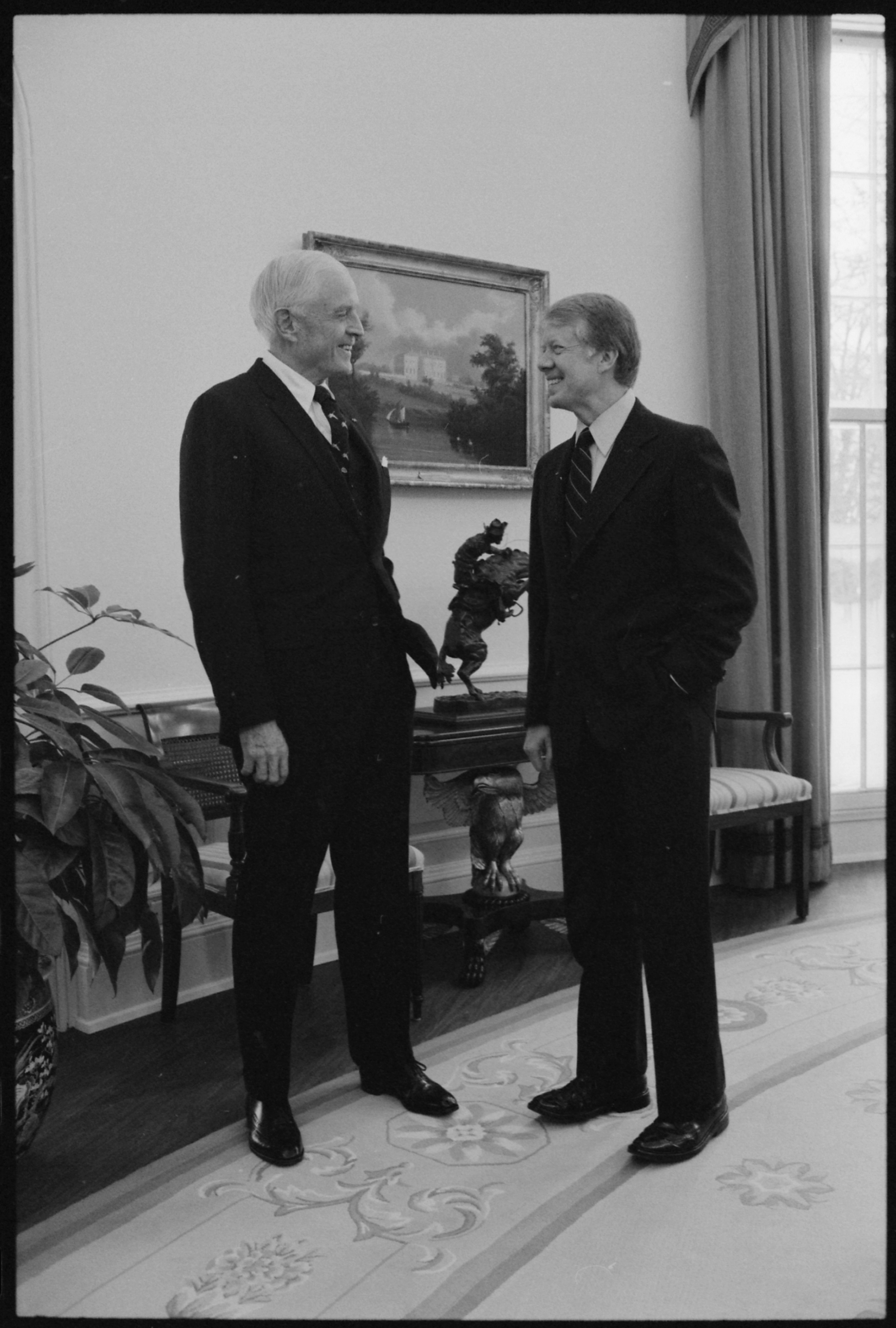
Watson with Jimmy Carter, January 20, 1978

Watson left IBM in 1971 on his doctor's advice after having a heart attack. After recovering, he was appointed by President Jimmy Carter to be chairman of the General Advisory Committee (GAC) on Arms Control and Disarmament, in support of the Arms Control and Disarmament Agency which had been previously set up by President John F. Kennedy. Watson advised President Carter against use of the experimental MX missile. After leaving the GAC, he was appointed by President Carter to be the US Ambassador to the Soviet Union, serving from October 29, 1979, to January 15, 1981.

Following his return home after Carter's defeat by Ronald Reagan in the 1980 United States presidential election, Watson gave the commencement speech at Harvard University in 1981 in which he warned against further escalation against the USSR. He was also a member of the Bohemian Club.

He was an avid sailor and pilot. He named 7 successive sailboats after Palawan, the last in 1991. Watson sailed one of his Palawans farther up the northern coast of Greenland than any non-military ship had done previously, receiving the New York Yacht Club's highest award and the Cruising Club of America's Blue Water Medal. He traveled the route of Captain Cook in exploring the Pacific. He flew helicopters, jets, and stunt planes, and was the first private citizen to receive permission from Soviet General Secretary Mikhail Gorbachev to fly across the Soviet Union, recreating in 1987 the ALSIB route from World War II.

== Personal life ==
Watson married Olive Cawley (1918–2004) in 1941. They had six children.

He had homes in Greenwich, Connecticut; North Haven, Maine; Stowe, Vermont; Vail, Colorado; New York City; and Antigua. He died in Greenwich on December 31, 1993, of complications following a stroke. He was 79.

== Philanthropy ==
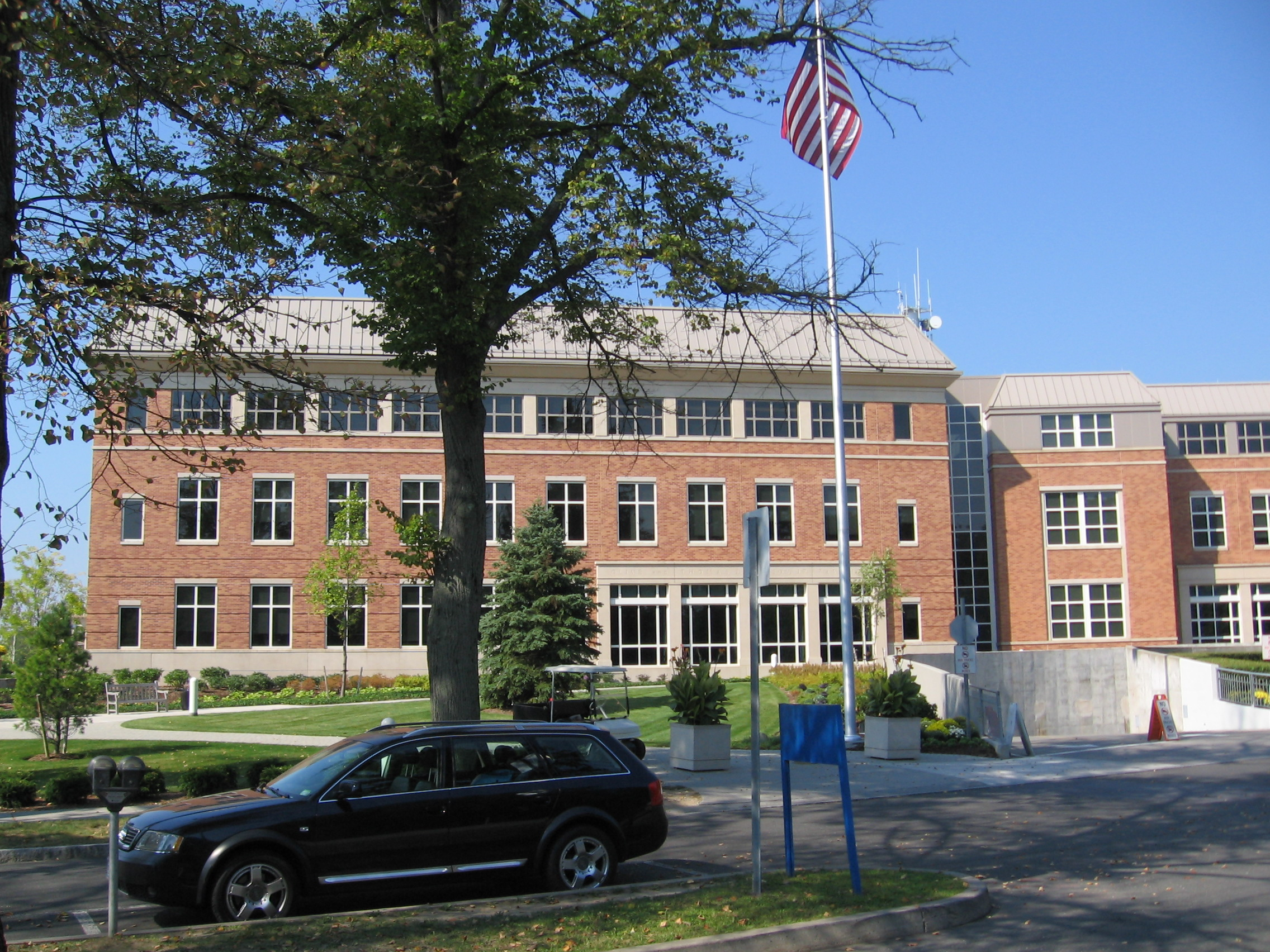
Olive and Thomas J. Watson Jr. Pavilion at Greenwich Hospital

Watson was the principal benefactor of the Watson Institute for International Studies at Brown University and the Thomas J. Watson Fellowship (which supports students to study a topic of personal interest for a year) and other charitable gifts. Watson contributed to the Watson Pavilion at Greenwich Hospital in Connecticut, which named the Olive and Thomas J. Watson Jr. Pavilion (a wing) after him and his wife. He was also the principal benefactor of Owls Head Transportation Museum in Owls Head, Maine. He was on the board of directors of the Bedford Stuyvesant Restoration Corporation and helped bring a factory employing over 300 people to the community that made cables, including ones for the US space program.

=== Columbia University ===
After leaving IBM, Watson donated tens of millions of dollars to Columbia University from 1975 onward. These included the Thomas J. Watson Library of Business and Economics and several smaller building grants. Watson funded a Columbia East Campus residence hall named Watson House.

== See also ==
- History of IBM
- Smugglers' Notch Ski Resort

Business positions
Preceded by Thomas J. Watson	CEO of IBM; 1956–1971	Succeeded by T. Vincent Learson
Boy Scouts of America
Preceded by Ellsworth H. Augustus	National president 1964–1968	Succeeded by Irving Feist
Diplomatic posts
Preceded by Malcolm Toon	United States Ambassador to the Soviet Union; 1979–1981	Succeeded by Arthur A. Hartman
