= T. Vincent Learson =

American businessman

- Born: September 26, 1912; Roslindale, Massachusetts
- Died: November 4, 1996 (aged 84); NewYork–Presbyterian Hospital
- Resting place: Gate of Heaven Cemetery
- Known for: Chairman and chief executive officer I.B.M.

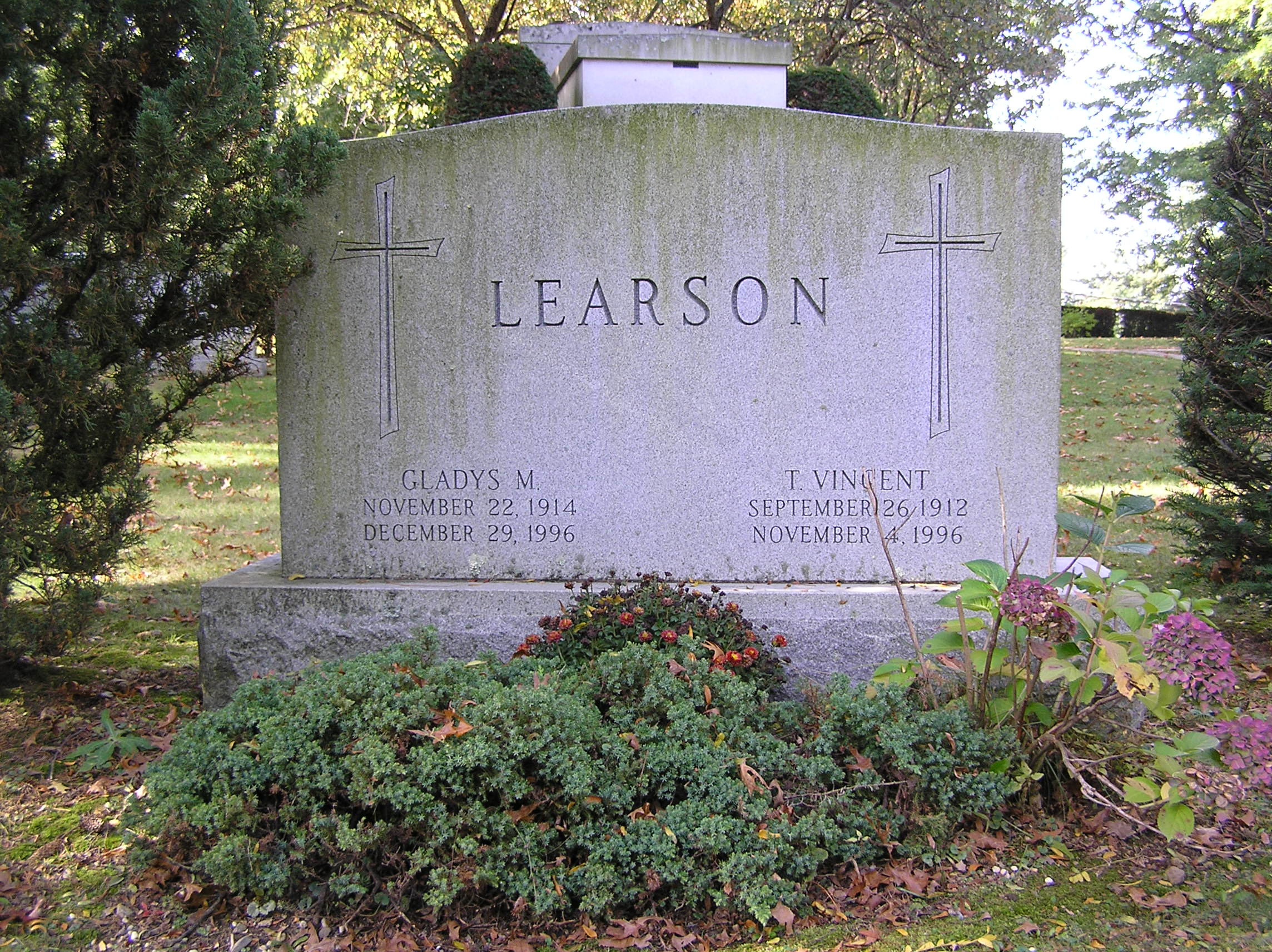
The grave of T. Vincent Learson in Gate of Heaven Cemetery

Thomas Vincent Learson (September 26, 1912 – November 4, 1996) was IBM's chairman and chief executive officer from June 1971 through January 1973. He was succeeded by Frank T. Cary. Both the previous chairman Thomas Watson Jr. and senior project manager Fred Brooks regarded Learson as the driving force behind the IBM System/360 project, which was huge and risky but whose success ensured IBM's dominance of the mainframe computer market.

He was born in Roslindale, Boston, Massachusetts, son of Richard J. Learson and Katharine E. (Goode) Learson. He graduated from Boston Latin School in 1931, then majored in mathematics at Harvard University, graduating in 1935.

From 1975 to 1977 he was Ambassador-at-Large for Law of the Sea Matters and Special Representative of the President for the Law of the Sea Conference, and Chief of Delegation.

He died at age 84 and is buried with his wife Gladys at the Gate of Heaven Cemetery, in Hawthorne, New York.

Business positions
Preceded by Thomas J. Watson Jr.	CEO of IBM; 1971-1973	Succeeded by Frank T. Cary
