= Ginni Rometty =

American business executive (born 1957)

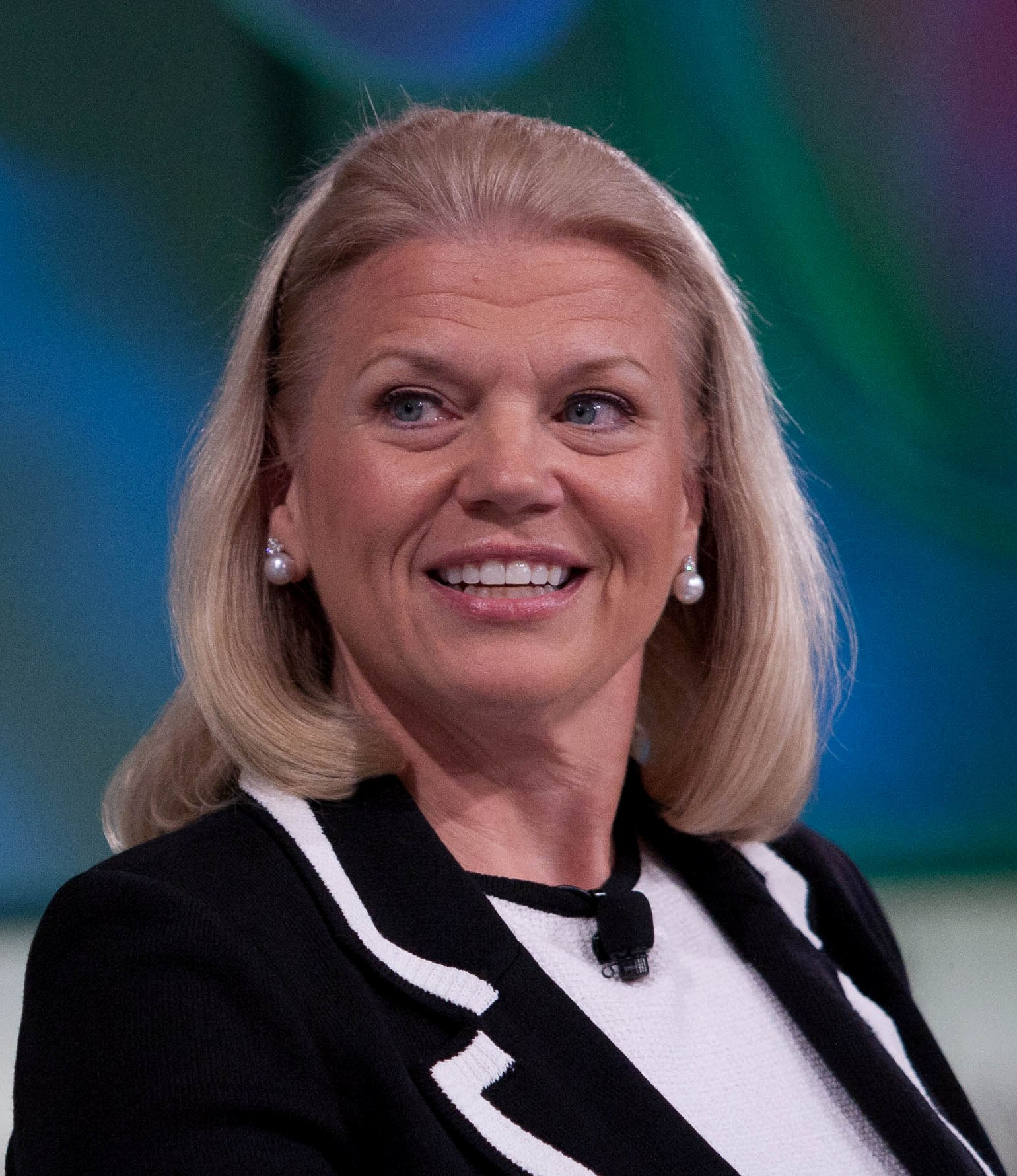
- Rometty in 2011
- Born: Virginia Marie Nicosia; July 29, 1957 (age 69); Chicago, Illinois, U.S.
- Education: Northwestern University (BS)
- Spouse: Mark Rometty (1979–present)

Virginia Marie Rometty (born July 29, 1957) is an American business executive who was executive chairman of IBM after stepping down as CEO on April 1, 2020. She was previously chairman, president and CEO of IBM, becoming the first woman to head the company. She retired from IBM on December 31, 2020, after a near-40 year career there. Before becoming president and CEO in January 2012, she first joined IBM as a systems engineer in 1981 and subsequently headed global sales, marketing, and strategy.

While general manager of IBM's global services division, in 2002 she helped negotiate IBM's purchase of PricewaterhouseCoopers' IT consulting business, becoming known for her work integrating the two companies. As CEO, she focused IBM on analytics, cloud computing, and cognitive computing systems.

Rometty's tenure as IBM's CEO was marked by awards including by Bloomberg's 50 Most Influential People in the World, Fortune's "50 Most Powerful Women in Business", Time's 20 Most Important People in Tech and Forbes' America's Top 50 Women In Tech. Her tenure was also met by fierce criticism relating to executive compensation bonuses, layoffs, outsourcing, and presiding over 24 consecutive quarters of revenue decline.

== Early life and education ==
Ginni Rometty was born on July 29, 1957, in Chicago, Illinois, as Virginia Nicosia. Growing up outside Chicago, she was the eldest of four children in an Italian-American family. Her parents divorced and her father left when she was fifteen years old, and her mother subsequently took on multiple jobs to support the family while Rometty looked after the household in the evenings.

She began attending Northwestern University in Illinois in 1975 on a scholarship from General Motors, where she interned between her junior and senior years. Rometty was also a member of the Kappa Kappa Gamma sorority, eventually becoming its president. She graduated with high honors from the Robert R. McCormick School of Engineering and Applied Science at Northwestern University in 1979, receiving a bachelor's degree in computer science and electrical engineering. She has received honorary doctoral degrees from Rensselaer Polytechnic Institute (2014) and Northwestern University (2015). She also received an honorary degree from North Carolina State University.

== Career ==
=== 1979–1990s: GM and IBM technical positions ===
After graduation in 1979, Rometty went to work for General Motors Institute in Flint, where she was responsible for application and systems development. In 1981 she joined IBM as a systems analyst and systems engineer in Detroit. Initially working with clients in the insurance industry, she spent her first ten years at IBM in technical positions. The New York Times writes that she "quickly moved up to a series of management jobs", where she worked with clients in insurance, banking, telecommunications, manufacturing and health care. She spent the 1990s working in sales, and by the late 1990s was helping clients such as Prudential Financial, Inc. with their internet features. She joined IBM's Consulting Group in 1991.

=== 2000–2011: IBM management ===
While general manager of IBM's global services division, in 2002 she championed and helped negotiate the purchase of Monday, the consulting arm of the professional services firm PricewaterhouseCoopers for $3.5 billion. The acquisition was the "largest in professional services history" and launched IBM in the services business. While senior vice president of IBM Global Business Services, Rometty then received her "big break" at IBM when she was given the task of integrating PricewaterhouseCoopers and its consultants with IBM. In 2002, Time named her in its 2002 Global Business Influential list. From 2005 until 2009, she was the senior vice president of Global Business Services at IBM, and she also became senior vice president of Enterprise Business Services-IBM Global Services in July 2005. Among other roles, she was general manager of IBM Global Services, Americas, as well as general manager of IBM's Global Insurance and Financial Services Sector. She was also a managing partner at IBM Business Consulting Services, Inc. and general manager of Insurance Industry Group. She received the Carl Sloane Award 2006 from the Association of Management Consulting Firms.

Laid out by Rometty and other IBM executives, in 2007 IBM announced a five-year growth plan concerning revenue growth and capital allocation. Among other strategies, the "2015 Roadmap" outlined moving IBM away from the hardware industry to focus on businesses such as software and services. She became senior vice president and group executive for sales, marketing and strategy in 2009, focusing on the company's "fast-growing analytics unit". In January 2009, she was placed in charge of IBM's sales force, as senior vice president of global sales and distribution until 2010. During this time, she pushed the development of IBM's growth-markets unit, which had been created in 2008 to focus on emerging markets such as Brazil and Vietnam. From 2010 until 2012 she was an IBM senior vice president, and from 2010 until 2012, she was IBM's Group Executive of Sales, Marketing & Strategy. In 2011, CNN reported that she was "credited with spearheading IBM's growth strategy by getting the company into the cloud computing and analytics businesses. She was also at the helm of readying Watson, the Jeopardy! playing computer, for commercial use."

=== 2012–2020: Leadership of IBM ===
On October 25, 2011, IBM announced that she was to be the company's next president and CEO, becoming the ninth chief executive in its history. Her role as IBM's first female chief received note in the press, with former CEO Sam Palmisano responding that her selection had "zero to do with progressive social policies". She became president and CEO on January 1, 2012, also taking on the additional role of IBM chairman on October 1, 2012, when Palmisano retired. With plans to take IBM out of unprofitable business lines and citing big data and analytics as IBM's "next big growth machine", in 2014 she brokered a partnership for Apple to design applications for IBM's enterprise customers. Later that year, she announced that IBM would partner with SAP on cloud computing and with Twitter on data analytics and, in 2015, she also brokered a partnership with Box. Rometty had IBM spend $8.5 billion acquiring around 30 companies between 2012 and 2015, and by 2016 she had overseen the divestment of about $7 billion in commoditized assets such as chip manufacturing.

In May 2017, Austin Business reported that Rometty had successfully moved IBM away from "shrinking businesses such as computers and operating system software, and into higher-growth areas like artificial intelligence." On June 28, 2017, she was awarded the KPMG Inspire Greatness Award. In January 2018, she announced IBM's first quarter of year-over-year revenue increase since 2012, with particular growth in areas such as data, blockchain, and the cloud. By 2018, she stated that around half of IBM's 9,043 patents in 2017 were in AI, cloud computing, cybersecurity, blockchain and quantum computing.

However, the accolades and awards did not translate into marketplace success, and under Rometty's tenure, IBM's revenue declined over 40%, from over $100b in 2011 to less than $60b in 2019. On January 30, 2020, it was announced that Rometty would be stepping down as IBM's CEO to be replaced by Arvind Krishna. She remained executive chairman until December 31, 2020, when she was replaced by Arvind Krishna.

== Boards and committees ==
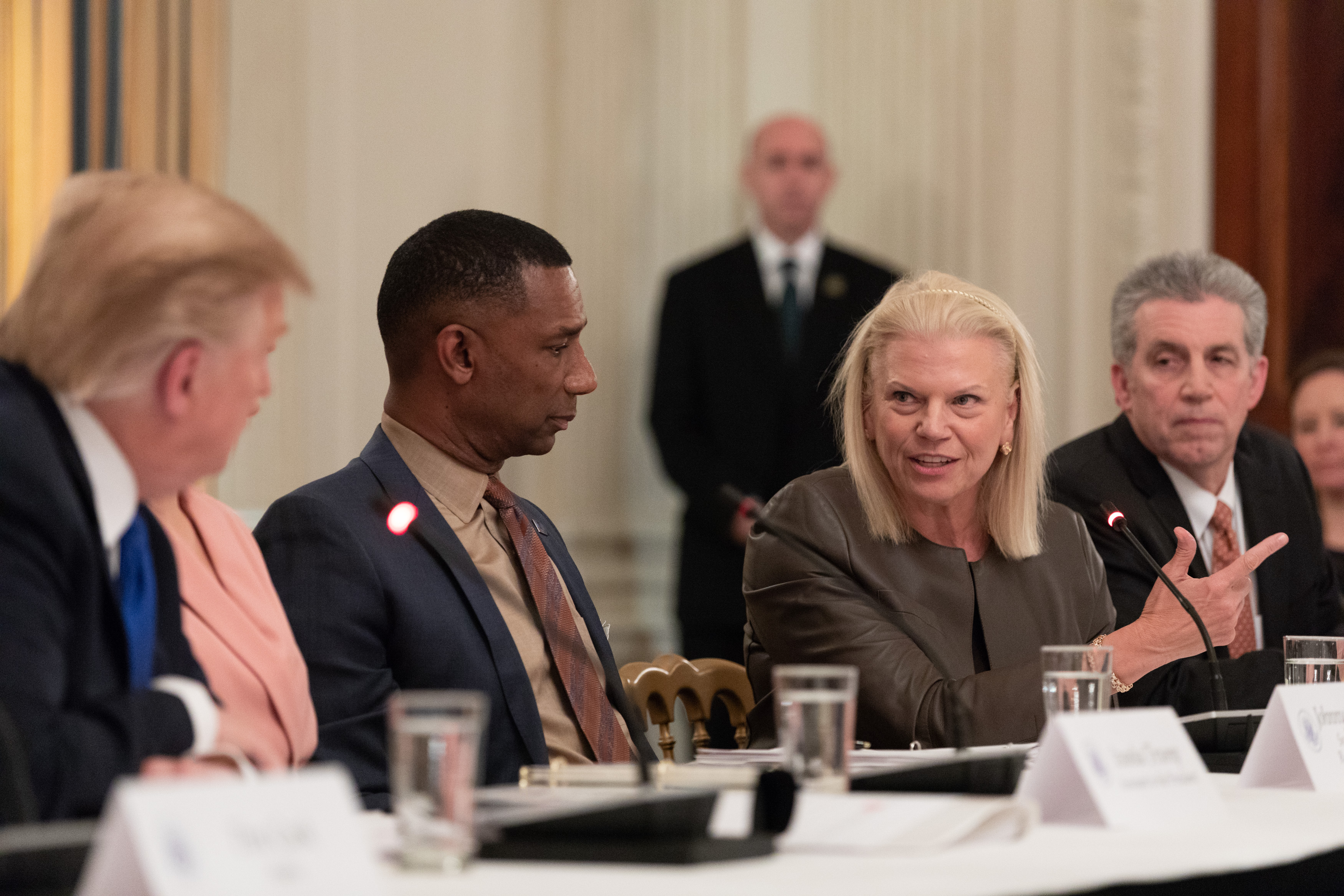
Rometty participates on a White House panel on workforce development in March 2019

A director at IBM since 2012, Rometty has also been involved in IBM organizations such as its Women in Technology Council, Women's Executive Council, and Women's Leadership Council. A former director at APQC, she also was on the board of directors of AIG from 2006 until 2009. She remains on the board of overseers and board of managers for the Memorial Sloan Kettering Cancer Center, and since 2013 she has been a council member at the Latin America Conservation Council. Rometty is on the Council on Foreign Relations and is also on the board of trustees of her alma mater Northwestern University, where she was commencement speaker for the graduating class of 2015. She was a member of the White House's Business Advisory Panel for much of 2017, before the panel dissolved itself that August. In November 2017, she co-chaired WEF Davos.

She also is the co-chair of the Aspen Institute’s Cyber Group, a member of the advisory board of Tsinghua University School of Economics and Management, and a member of the Singapore Economic Development Board International Advisory Council. In May 2020, she was elected to the board of JPMorgan Chase.

== Industry reception ==
Rometty's tenure as IBM CEO has been marked by prestigious rankings, including by Bloomberg, who named her among the 50 Most Influential People in the World in 2012. She was also named to the Time 100 list in 2012, and in 2014 Rometty was featured in the PBS documentary The Boomer List. Since 2005 she has been listed among Fortune's "50 Most Powerful Women in Business", ranking in the top 10 since 2010. After ranking No. 7 in 2011, she ranked No. 1 from 2012 until 2014, No. 3 in 2015, No. 4 in 2016, and No. 7 in 2017. She was named to Forbes magazine's "World's 100 Most Powerful People" in 2014, and she also ranked No. 11 on the 2016 Forbes list of The World's 100 Most Powerful Women. The following year she ranked No. 10. She was named the sixth most important person in tech by Time magazine in March 2018.

Rometty's tenure as CEO has met with criticism as well, during her tenure, IBM revenue dropped from $104 billion in 2012 to $60 billion in 2020. By 2016, she had been named among the worst CEOs by publications including the Motley Fool, Forbes, the Wall Street Journal, and 24/7 Wallstreet. She was criticized by investors for 22 consecutive quarters of revenue decline between 2012 and the summer of 2017, and by IBM employees for accepting pay bonuses during times of layoffs and offshoring.

In May 2019, Rometty received the Edison Achievement Award for her commitment to innovation throughout her career.

== Personal life ==
Virginia Nicosia married Mark Anthony Rometty, a private-equity investor, in 1979. With no children, they divide their time between New York and Naples, Florida. She goes to Broadway shows and participates in scuba diving as a hobby. In 2014, she became the third female member of the Augusta National Golf Club, following the lead of Condoleezza Rice.

Business positions
Preceded by Samuel J. Palmisano	CEO of IBM; 2012–2020	Succeeded by Arvind Krishna
Preceded by Samuel J. Palmisano	President of IBM; 2012–2020	Succeeded by Jim Whitehurst
Preceded by Samuel J. Palmisano	Executive Chairman of IBM; 2012–2020	Succeeded by Arvind Krishna
