= Follett Bradley =

American Brigadier General

Major General Follett Bradley
- Born: February 12, 1890; Omaha, Nebraska, U.S.
- Died: August 4, 1952 (aged 62); Long Island, New York, U.S.
- Military career
- Allegiance: United States
- Branch: United States Army
- Service years: 1935–1944
- Rank: Colonel (USA): Brigadier general (USA retired list); Lieutenant colonel (US Army)
- Commands: Commander, 3rd Bombardment Wing and III Bombardment Command, 1941-1942; Commanding General, First Air Force, March–July 1942; Minister to Russia, August–December 1942; Air Inspector, Headquarters, U.S. Army Air Force Headquarters, 1943.

Follett Bradley (February 12, 1890 – August 4, 1952) was an American career soldier, military officer, and Major General.

== Biography ==
Bradley was born in Omaha, Nebraska, on 12 February 1890. He attended Highland Park High School in Highland Park, Illinois.

He died on 4 August 1952 in Long Island, New York, and was buried with full military honours at the Arlington National Cemetery.

== Career ==
He graduated from the United States Naval Academy in 1910. Bradley served in the Navy until 1912 when he transferred to the US Army.

=== Military career ===
Bradley served in a number of commanding roles and responsibilities, including Commander of the 3rd Bombardment Wing and III Bombardment Command. From 1941 to 1942, he was the Commanding General of First Air Force. From 1943 onwards, he served at the Headquarters of U.S. Army Air Force.

He succeeded Brig. Gen. Arnold N. Krogstad.

=== Business career ===
He played a key role in the early history of the IBM mainframe company. He provided valuable mentorship and guidance to the son of the founder of IBM, Thomas J. Watson Jr., and played a key role in his business successes.

== Dates of ranks ==
The progression of his ranks and promotions is provided below:

1935-08-01 Lieutenant-Colonel

1936-08-26 Colonel (Temporary)

1940-10-01 Brigadier-General (Army of the United States)

1940-12-01 Colonel

1942-02-25 Major-General (Army of the United States)

1944-04-30 Major-General (Retired)

== Awards and honours ==
He was cited for gallantry and received the Silver Star and the French Croix de Guerre with palms.

He also received the Mexican Border Service Medal and the Distinguished Service Medal.
