= Frank T. Cary =

American executive and businessman

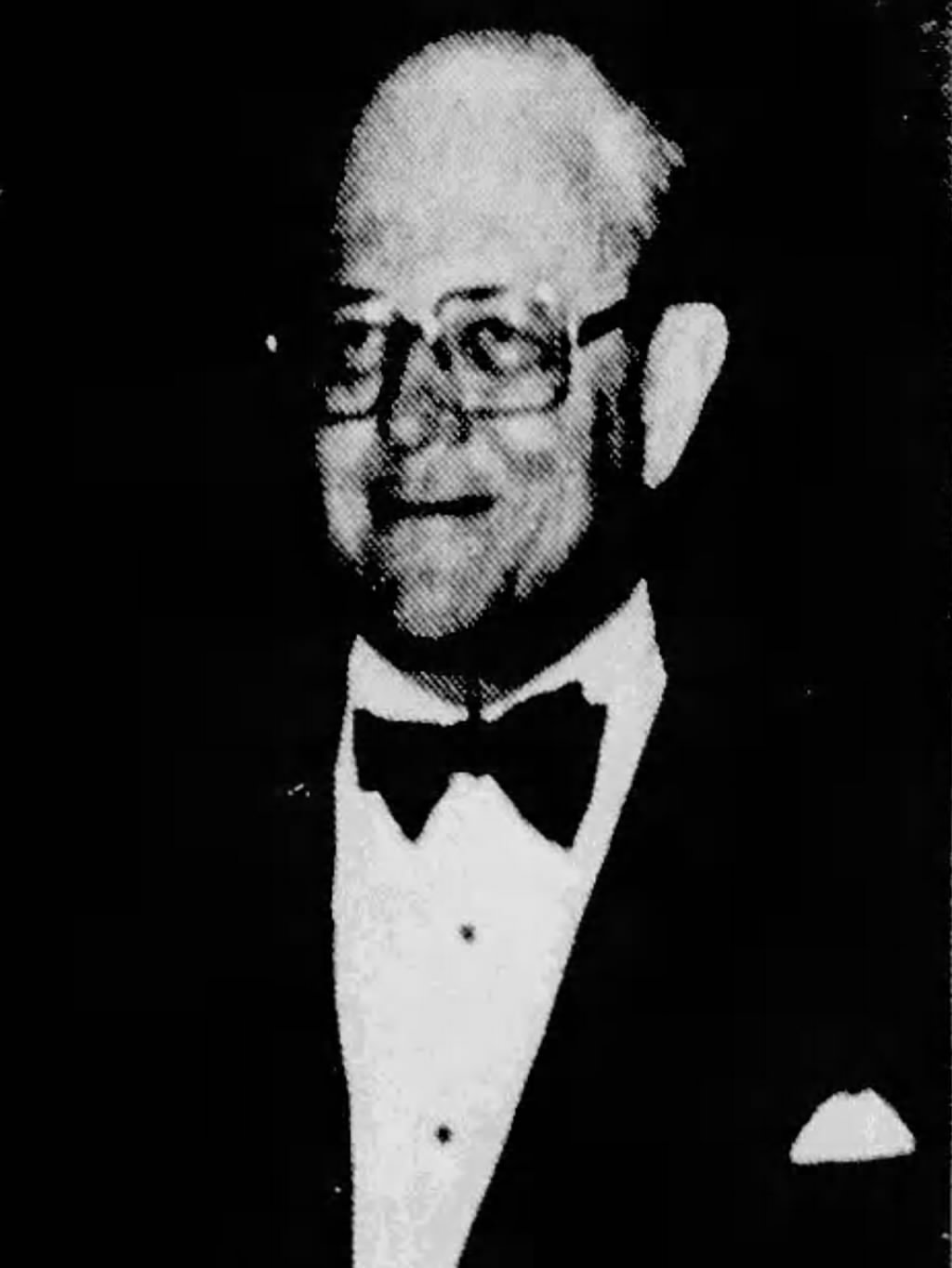
- Cary in 1977
- Born: Frank Taylor Cary; December 14, 1920; Gooding, Idaho
- Died: January 1, 2006 (aged 85); Darien, Connecticut
- Education: University of California, Los Angeles (BA); Stanford University (MBA)

Frank T. Cary (December 14, 1920 – January 1, 2006) was an American executive and businessman. Cary was the chairman of IBM from 1973 to 1983, and CEO from 1973 to 1981.

== Early life and education ==
Frank Taylor Cary was born on December 14, 1920, in Gooding, Idaho. Taylor was the son of Dr. Frank T. Cary and Ida Hayden. The family moved to Inglewood, California not long after his birth. He received a bachelor's degree from the University of California, Los Angeles in 1943 and a Master of Business Administration degree from Stanford University in 1948.

== Career ==
=== IBM ===
Cary joined IBM in 1948 as a salesman in Los Angeles. He held a variety of management positions and became president of the Data Processing Division in 1964. Advancing through the management ranks, he became general manager of data processing and vice president after two years, then became a senior vice president in 1967. The following year, he was appointed as a member of the board of directors then joined the Corporate Office and the Management Review Committee. In January 1973, Cary was named chairman and CEO.

He was chief executive at IBM during a period of rapid growth in product, revenue, and profit. He started the creation of a small group within IBM dedicated to spearhead an answer to Apple Inc.

He stepped down from his position in 1981 but remained a director until 1991.

=== Boards and Committees ===
Cary was Chairman of biotechnology company Celgene Corporation from 1986 to 1990. He was a member of the Steering Committee of the Bilderberg Group.

He joined the MIT Corporation in 1974 and became a life member in 1984. He was on several committees, including the committee of Electrical Engineering and Computer Science.

He was on the board of directors of JP Morgan, ABC, Texaco, and others. He also was on boards of many nonprofit organizations, including the American Museum of Natural History and Rockefeller University.

== Personal life and death ==
He was married to Anne (Curtis) Cary. They raised three sons, and a daughter. His hobbies included skiing, tennis, and golf. He died at the age of 85, at his home in Darien, Connecticut, on New Year's Day 2006.

Business positions
Preceded by T. Vincent Learson	CEO of IBM; 1973–1981	Succeeded by John R. Opel
