= Lou Gerstner =

American businessman (1942–2025)

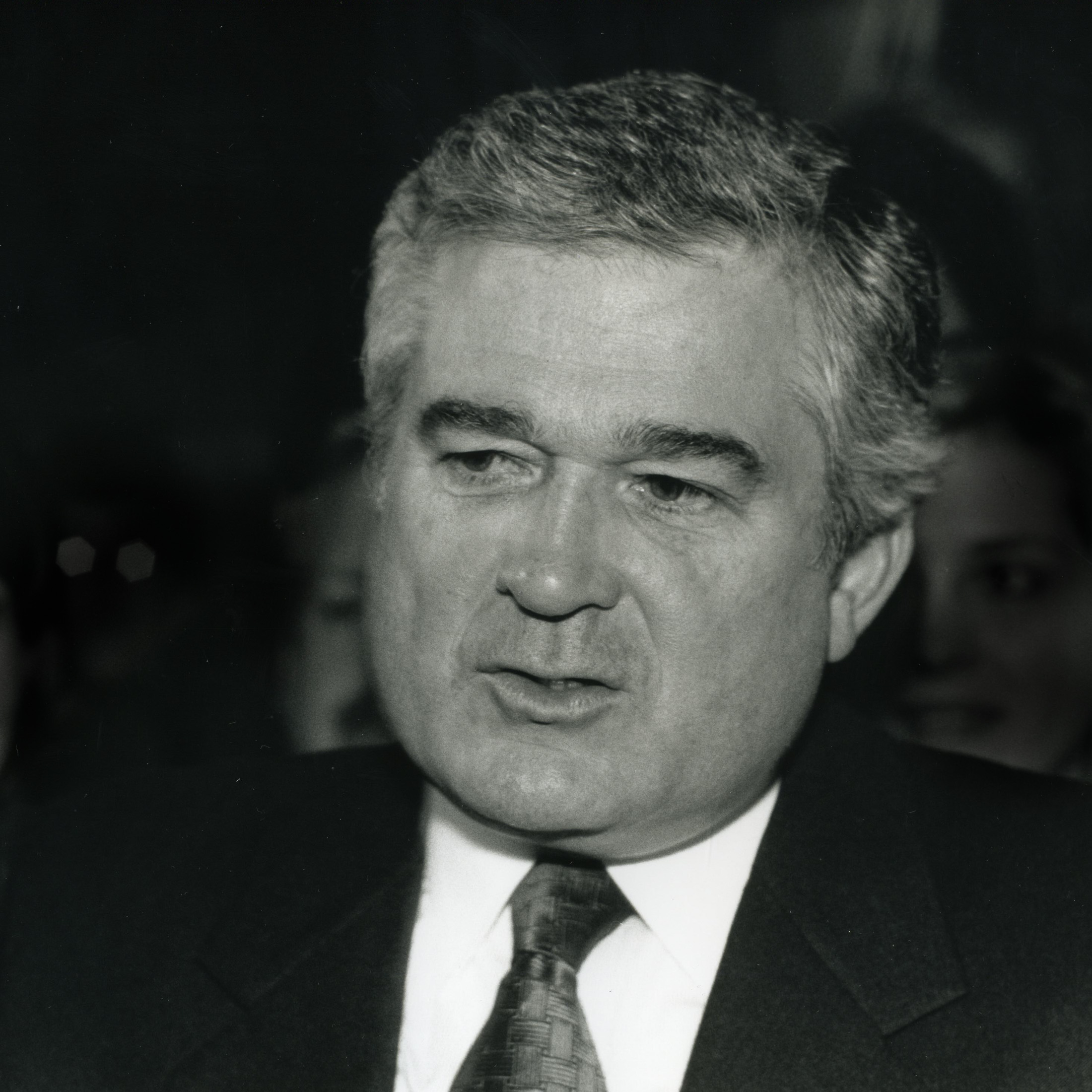
- Gerstner c. 1995
- Born: Louis Vincent Gerstner Jr. March 1, 1942; Mineola, New York, U.S.
- Died: December 27, 2025 (aged 83); Jupiter, Florida, U.S.
- Education: Dartmouth College (BA); Harvard University (MBA)
- Occupations: Chairman and CEO, RJR Nabisco (1989–1993); Chairman and CEO, IBM (1993–2002); Chairman, The Carlyle Group (2003–2008)
- Known for: Leading IBM's historic corporate turnaround in the 1990s
- Board member of: Chairman, The Broad Institute of MIT and Harvard (2013–2021); Chairman, Gerstner Sloan Kettering Graduate School of Biomedical Sciences (2014–2025)
- Spouse: Robin Gerstner
- Children: 2

Louis Vincent Gerstner Jr. (March 1, 1942 – December 27, 2025) was an American businessman, best known for his tenure as chairman and chief executive officer of IBM from April 1993 until 2002, when he retired as CEO in March and chairman in December. He is largely credited with turning IBM's fortunes around. Lou Gerstner was the chairman of Gerstner Philanthropies.

Gerstner was also CEO of RJR Nabisco, and held senior positions at American Express and McKinsey & Company. He was a graduate of Chaminade High School (1959), Dartmouth College (1963), and held an MBA from the Harvard Business School (1965).

He was chairman of the Broad Institute of MIT and Harvard and was chairman emeritus of the board of the Gerstner Sloan Kettering Graduate School of Biomedical Sciences.

Gerstner was the author of Who Says Elephants Can't Dance?, about IBM's transformation; and co-author of the book Reinventing Education: Entrepreneurship in America's Public Schools.

== Early years ==
Gerstner was born in Mineola, New York, on March 1, 1942. He wrote in Who Says Elephants Can't Dance? that his parents had remortgaged their house every four years to pay for schooling. He went to Chaminade High School, a Catholic school, and then to Dartmouth College for an undergraduate degree in engineering science. He received an M.B.A. from Harvard Business School. Fresh out of Harvard, he joined McKinsey & Company at the age of 23, became a partner at 28 and a senior partner at 31.

== American Express ==
Gerstner joined American Express in 1978 and headed its Travel Related Services unit. Under his leadership, the company's market share increased significantly by 1985. He achieved this by finding new uses and users for the famed American Express Card, such as college students, physicians, and women, as well as persuading corporations to adopt the card as a more effective way of tracking business expenses. He also created exclusive versions of the card for higher-end clients, such as the Gold Card and the Platinum Card.

As sales and profits rebounded, Gerstner was promoted to chairman and chief executive officer of AmEx's Travel Related Services in 1982, and president of the parent company in 1985. Although he claimed the position at the age of 43, Gerstner dismissed the speculation that his success was the product of being a workaholic. Gerstner told Leslie Wayne, "I hear that and I can't accept that. A workaholic can't take vacations and I take four weeks a year."

As chairman and chief executive officer of the Travel Related Services division, Gerstner spearheaded its successful "membership has its privileges" promotion. Not only was the division continually the most profitable in the company, but it also led the entire financial services industry. Despite these successes, Gerstner hit a ceiling at American Express, as chief executive James D. Robinson III was not expected to retire for another 12 years. During Gerstner's 11-year tenure at American Express, membership had increased from 8.6 million to 30.7 million. He left AmEx in 1989 to succeed Ross Johnson as chairman and chief executive officer of RJR Nabisco following its $25 billion leveraged buyout by Kohlberg Kravis Roberts.

== IBM ==
Gerstner was hired as chairman and CEO of IBM in April 1993. Under pressure from investors, his predecessor John Akers was forced to resign. The board initially looked within the computer industry for his successor. However Apple's John Sculley, Motorola chairman George Fisher, and Bill Gates of Microsoft were not interested (other rumored candidates included Eckhard Pfeiffer of Compaq and Scott McNealy of Sun Microsystems). IBM then turned to Gerstner, an outsider with a record that suggested success whose older brother Richard had run the company's PC division until retiring due to health issues four years earlier. Gerstner was the first IBM CEO who was hired from outside the company.

Upon becoming chief executive of IBM, Gerstner declared: "the last thing IBM needs right now is a vision", as he instead focused on execution, decisiveness, simplifying the organization for speed, and breaking the gridlock. Many expected heads to roll, yet Gerstner initially changed only the CFO, the HR chief, and three key line executives.

In his memoir, Who Says Elephants Can't Dance?, he describes his arrival at the company in April 1993, when an active plan was in place to dis-aggregate the company. The prevailing wisdom of the time held that IBM's core mainframe business was headed for obsolescence. The company's own management was in the process of allowing its various divisions to rebrand and manage themselves — the so-called "Baby Blues". Then-CEO John Akers decided that the logical and rational solution was to split IBM into autonomous business units (such as processors, storage, software, services, printers) that could compete more effectively with competitors that were more focused and agile and had lower cost structures. Gerstner reversed this plan, realizing from his previous experiences at RJR and American Express that there remained a vital need for a broad-based information technology integrator. He discovered that the biggest problem that all major companies faced in 1993 was integrating all the separate computing technologies that were emerging at the time, and saw that IBM's unique competitive advantage was its ability to provide integrated solutions for customers – a company that could represent more than piece parts or components—something he only learned by going beyond just listening to the proponents of different technologies within IBM. His choice to keep the company together was the defining decision of his tenure, as these gave IBM the capabilities to deliver complete IT solutions to customers. Services could be sold as an add-on to companies that had already bought IBM computers, while barely profitable pieces of hardware were used to open the door to more profitable deals.

One of the strategic visions that Gerstner set for IBM in 1993 was to make e-business its heart and soul. He believed in the potential of B2B e-commerce and wanted to expand the application of the internet to more than just web-page browsing and consumer marketing. He argued that a network-centric approach would shift the workload from personal computers to larger enterprise-systems and allow the internet to be embedded into all aspects of business operations. IBM's initial vision for how e-business could transform the world included electronic debit services that would allow customers to place orders online and eventually shop at virtual stores, creating virtual databases of movies, books, and music that would be available from anywhere in the world, and more. Soon after, Gerstner announced e-business as IBM's growth strategy and formed the IBM Internet Division, led by Irving Wladawsky-Berger. In 1996, IBM's marketing department established the term e-business for any kind of business or commercial transaction conducted over the internet. Under Gerstner, e-business transformed IBM and within six years, they became the market leader in providing the products and services needed to transform any of their customers businesses into a network-centric e-business.

While IBM had been credited with turning the personal computer (PC) into a mainstream product, the company could no longer monopolize its market. A proliferation of cheaper IBM-compatible PC clones that used the same Intel chips and Microsoft operating system software simply undercut it and eroded market share. Outgoing IBM chairman and CEO Akers, a company lifer, was excessively immersed in its corporate culture, remaining loyal to traditional ways that masked the real threats. As an outsider, Gerstner had no emotional attachment to long-suffering products IBM had developed to try to regain control of the PC market. Gerstner wrote that in spite of OS/2's technical superiority to the dominant Microsoft Windows 3.0, his colleagues were "unwilling or unable to accept" that it was a "resounding defeat" as it "was draining tens of millions of dollars, absorbing huge chunks of senior management's time, and making a mockery of our image". By the end of 1994, IBM ceased new development of OS/2 software. IBM withdrew from the retail desktop PC market entirely, which had become unprofitable due to price pressures in the early 2000s. Three years after Gerstner's 2002 retirement, IBM sold the PC division to Lenovo.

In his memoir, Gerstner described the turnaround as difficult and often wrenching for an IBM culture that had become insular and balkanized. After he arrived, over 100,000 employees were laid off from a company that had maintained a lifetime employment practice from its inception. Long allowed by their managers to believe that employment security had little reference to performance, thousands of IBM employees had grown lax, while the top-performing employees complained bitterly in attitude surveys. In the goal to create one common brand message for all IBM products and services around the world, under Gerstner's leadership the company consolidated its many advertising agencies down to just Ogilvy & Mather. Layoffs and other tough management measures continued in the first two years of his tenure, but the company was saved, and business success has continued to grow steadily since then.

From 1993 to Gerstner's retirement in 2002, IBM's market capitalization rose from $29 billion to $168 billion. Despite his success Gerstner also presided over the company's decline, relative to newer rivals, as it lost its once-dominant position in the IT industry. Microsoft grew beyond just PC software in the 1990s, hardware companies Apple and Dell expanded their market share, and entirely new entities such as the Google search engine emerged and created new computer-based business empires. Gerstner was also the first highly-paid IBM CEO relative to his home-grown predecessors, earning a personal fortune of hundreds of millions in his role. His philosophy, quoted as "The importance of managers being aligned with shareholders—not through risk-free instruments like stock options, but through the process of putting their own money on the line through direct ownership of the company—became a critical part of the management philosophy I brought to IBM" has been criticized for IBM's management in the late 2000s becoming "fully isolated and immune from the long-term consequences of their decisions".

== Philanthropies ==
Gerstner established the Gerstner Family Foundation in 1989 and was the chairman. The Gerstner Family Foundation, and other Gerstner charitable vehicles (together "Gerstner Philanthropies"), provide support to not-for-profit organizations in four primary program areas: biomedical research, education, environment, and Helping Hands. In addition to these four program areas, the organization will choose additional areas to focus on from time to time. As of 2025, supporting emergency food programs through regional food banks and food pantries has become a priority as the number of Americans who are food insecure has increased. Gerstner Philanthropies has made over $300 million in grants.

Gerstner Philanthropies has invested over $180 million in Biomedical research programs that support cancer and genomic research, as well as fellowships for early-career researchers working to make advances in medicine that can be translated into the clinic. Over 200 researchers have been named as Gerstner Scholars.

Grantmaking in Environmental research aims to address climate change by reducing methane emissions from livestock, and developing solutions to reduce plastic pollution.

In Education, the foundation has directly supported over 1,600 students through scholarship grants. By funding organizations that support college access programs, innovative school models, and emergency cash assistance initiatives, funds have benefited thousands of additional students.

The Helping Hands program has helped over 22,000 families and individuals with one-time financial emergencies. By providing one-time grants to those experiencing financial hardship, Helping Hands prevents families from losing stability and entering the shelter system. The majority of grants are for eviction prevention. These grants are administered by partner organizations who focus on alleviating poverty and providing holistic support to their clients. In June 2023, Gerstner published an opinion piece in the Wall Street Journal, highlighting the impact of the Foundation's Helping Hands program and its approach to preventing homelessness.

== Boards and affiliations ==
Throughout his career, Gerstner remained active in both corporate and nonprofit governance.

In January 2003, Gerstner assumed the position of chairman of The Carlyle Group, a Washington, D.C., global private equity firm. He was chairman from January 2003 until October 2008 and upon retiring from that position, continued as a senior advisor to Carlyle through September 2016. Gerstner held board positions at major corporations including American Express, AT&T, Bristol-Meyers Squibb, Caterpillar, and the New York Times.

Gerstner's nonprofit leadership included being a member of the board of the Council on Foreign Relations (1995–2005), Citizen Regent for the Smithsonian Board of Regents (1996–1999), Chairman of the Board of the Memorial Sloan Kettering Institute for Cancer Research (2000–2012), Trustee for the American Museum of Natural History (2003–2020), and Chairman of the Board of the Broad Institute of MIT and Harvard (2013–2021).

== Personal life and death ==
Gerstner was married to Robin Gerstner, née Link. He had two children, the neuro-oncologist Elizabeth Gerstner and Louis Gerstner III, who died in 2013.

Prior to his death, Gerstner lived in Hobe Sound, Florida. He died in Jupiter, Florida, on December 27, 2025, at the age of 83.

== Honors ==
Gerstner was elected to the National Academy of Engineering in 1999 for technical leadership in enhancing the competitiveness of U.S. industry and was a fellow of the American Academy of Arts and Sciences. In 2008, Gerstner received the Legend in Leadership Award from the Yale School of Management. The University of Rochester's Simon School of Business awarded him their Executive of the Year Award in 2013.

Gerstner was awarded multiple honorary doctorates. He was awarded honorary Doctor of Laws from Wake Forest, Brown University, and Notre Dame. In addition, he received honorary Doctor of Science from the American Museum of Natural History and the Gerstner Graduate School of Biomedical Science at Memorial Sloan Kettering Cancer Center. Gerstner also received an honorary Doctor of Humane Letters from Dartmouth College.

He received numerous awards for his work in education, among them the Cleveland E. Dodge Medal for Distinguished Service to Education from Teachers College, Columbia University, and the Distinguished Service to Science and Education award from the American Museum of Natural History. Gerstner was awarded the designation of honorary Knight Commander of the British Empire by Queen Elizabeth II in June 2001 in recognition of his work on behalf of public education, as well as his business accomplishments.

Business positions
Preceded by John F. Akers	CEO of IBM; 1993–2002	Succeeded by Samuel J. Palmisano
