= IBM and World War II =

Use of IBM technology during World War II

Both the United States and Nazi Germany used IBM-punched card technology for some parts of their operations and record keeping.

== By country ==
=== Germany ===
In Germany, during World War II, IBM engaged in business practices which have been the source of controversy. Much attention focuses on the role of IBM's German subsidiary, known as Deutsche Hollerith Maschinen Gesellschaft, or Dehomag. Topics in this regard include:

- documenting operations by Dehomag which allowed the Nazis to better organize their war effort, in particular the Holocaust and use of Nazi concentration camps;
- comparing these efforts to operations by other IBM subsidiaries which aided other nations' war efforts;
- and ultimately, assessing the degree to which IBM should be held culpable for atrocities which were made possible by its actions.
- the selection methods they developed and used had the purpose of selecting and killing civilians.

=== United States ===
In the United States, IBM was, at the request of the government, the subcontractor of the punched card project for the internment camps of Japanese Americans:

His grand design for 1943 was a locator file in which would appear a Hollerith alphabetic punch card for each evacuee. These cards were to include standard demographic information about age, sex, education, occupation, family size, medical history, criminal record, and RC location. However, additional data categories about links to Japan were also maintained, such as years of residence in Japan and the extent of education received there... The punch card project was so extensive and immediate that the War Relocation Authority subcontracted the function to IBM.

IBM equipment was used for cryptography by US Army and Navy organisations, Arlington Hall and OP-20-G and similar Allied organisations using Hollerith punched cards (Central Bureau and the Far East Combined Bureau).

The company developed and built the Automatic Sequence Controlled Calculator which was used to perform computations for the Manhattan Project.

== Criticism of IBM's actions during World War II ==
A 2001 book by Edwin Black, entitled IBM and the Holocaust, reached the conclusion that IBM's commercial activities in Germany during World War II make it morally complicit in the Holocaust. An updated 2002 paperback edition of the book included new evidence of the connection between IBM's United States headquarters, which controlled a Polish subsidiary, and the Nazis. Oliver Burkeman wrote for The Guardian, "The paperback provides the first evidence that the company's dealings with the Nazis were controlled from its New York headquarters throughout the second world war."

In February 2001, an Alien Tort Claims Act claim was filed in U.S. federal court on behalf of concentration camp survivors against IBM. The suit accused IBM of allegedly providing the punched card technology that facilitated the Holocaust, and for covering up German IBM subsidiary Dehomag's activities. In April 2001, the lawsuit was dropped after lawyers feared the suit would slow down payments from a German Holocaust fund for Holocaust survivors who had suffered under Nazi persecution. IBM's German division had paid $3 million into the fund, while making it clear they were not admitting liability.

In 2004, the human rights organization Gypsy International Recognition and Compensation Action (GIRCA) filed suit against IBM in Switzerland. The case was dismissed in 2006, as the statute of limitations had expired.

=== Responses to critics ===
In an "IBM Statement on Nazi-era Book and Lawsuit", IBM responded in February 2001 that:

It has been known for decades that the Nazis used Hollerith equipment and that IBM's German subsidiary during the 1930s – Deutsche Hollerith Maschinen GmbH (Dehomag) – supplied Hollerith equipment. As with hundreds of foreign-owned companies that did business in Germany at that time, Dehomag came under the control of Nazi authorities prior to and during World War II. It is also widely known that Thomas J. Watson, Sr., received and subsequently repudiated and returned a medal presented to him by the German government for his role in global economic relations. These well-known facts appear to be the primary underpinning for these recent allegations.

Richard Bernstein, writing for The New York Times Book Review in 2001, pointed out that "many American companies did what I.B.M. did. ... What then makes I.B.M. different?" He states that Black's case in his book IBM and the Holocaust "is long and heavily documented, and yet he does not demonstrate that I.B.M. bears some unique or decisive responsibility for the evil that was done." IBM quoted this claim in a March 2002 "Addendum to IBM Statement on Nazi-era Book and Lawsuit," after the publication of Black's revised paperback edition:

Mr. Black is asserting that IBM is withholding materials regarding this era in its archives. There is no basis for such assertions and we deplore the use of such claims to sell books.

== See also ==
- IBM and the Holocaust
- German re-armament
- List of International subsidiaries of IBM
- History of IBM § 1939–1945: World War II
- Thomas J. Watson, Sr. § Head of IBM
- Never Again pledge
