= Politehnica University of Bucharest =

University in Bucharest, Romania

- Universitatea Națională de Știință și Tehnologie POLITEHNICA București
- Seal of the Politehnica University of Bucharest
- Former names: Politehnica School of Bucharest (1920–1948); Polytechnic Institute of Bucharest (1948–1992)
- Type: Public
- Established: 10 June 1920; 106 years ago 1864 - School of Bridges and Roads, Mines and Architecture; 1818 - School for Surveying Engineers
- Rector: Mihnea Costoiu
- Faculty: 1,400
- Administrative staff: 1,300
- Students: 25,469 (2011–2012)
- Undergraduates: 16,864
- Postgraduates: 8,605
- Location: Bucharest, Romania; 44°26′18″N 26°03′05″E
- Website: www.upb.ro

University rankings

Regional – Overall
- QS Emerging Europe and Central Asia: 81 (2022)

Politehnica University of Bucharest (Romanian: Universitatea Națională de Știință și Tehnologie POLITEHNICA București) is a technical university in Bucharest, Romania founded in 1818. Politehnica University is classified by the Ministry of Education as an advanced research and education university.

The university is a member of the European Association for International Education (EAIE), the European University Association (EUA), the EUA Council for Doctoral Education, the CESAER (Council of Universities of Science and Technology in Europe), and the Romanian Alliance of Technical Universities (ARUT).

== History ==
Politehnica University of Bucharest is the largest technical university in Romania. Its traditions are connected to the founding of the first higher technical school in Wallachia, in 1818, by Gheorghe Lazăr. Born in Avrig, Transylvania, Gheorghe Lazăr studied in Sibiu, Cluj, and Vienna. In 1817–1818 he endeavored to convince the local noblemen of the need to support a modern technical school in Romania. Thus, on 24 March 1818, by a princely edict of Ioan Caragea, it was organised the Technical Superior School for Surveying Engineers (Școala Tehnică Superioară pentru Ingineri Hotarnici) within the Academic School for Philosophy and Mathematical Sciences of the Saint Sava Princely Academy.

In 1832 the school was reorganized, including four cycles, in accordance with the provisions of Organic Regulation. Among other faculties, the one dealing with exact sciences included courses such as applied trigonometry, geodesy, mineralogy, engineering graphics, descriptive geometry, mechanical elements applied to ordinary machines, principles of building roads and bridges, elements of architecture, etc. The graduates were obliged either to work for three years for the state or to return the grant received.

In 1862, the ruler of the United Principalities, Alexandru Ioan Cuza, had established by another Princely Decree a set of rules for the organisation of civil engineers, the hierarchy of engineers or conductors, their salaries, the conditions for admission and promotion, were clearly defined. On 1 October 1864, the School of Bridges and Roads, Mines and Architecture was established.

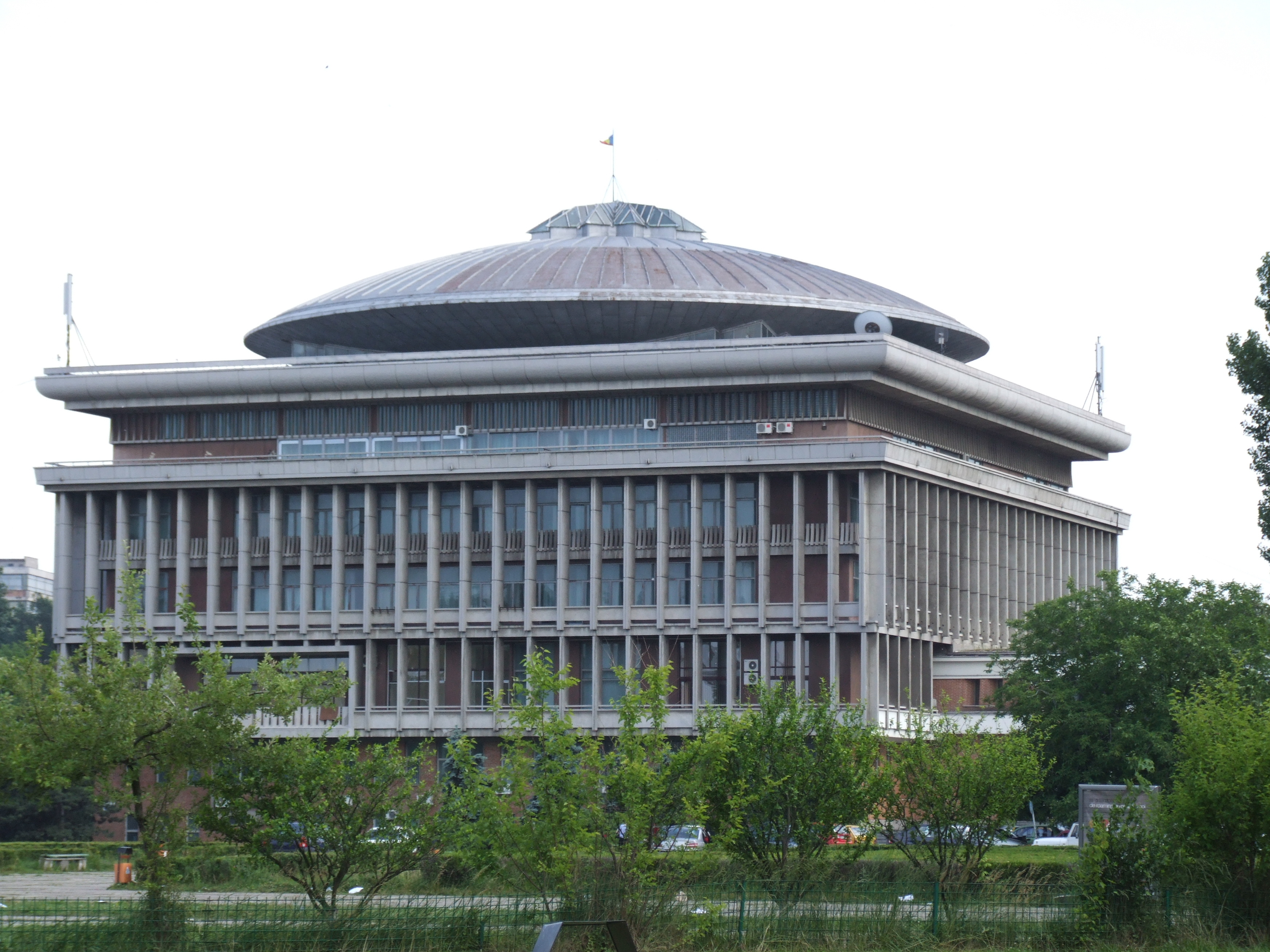
The main administrative building "Rectorat"

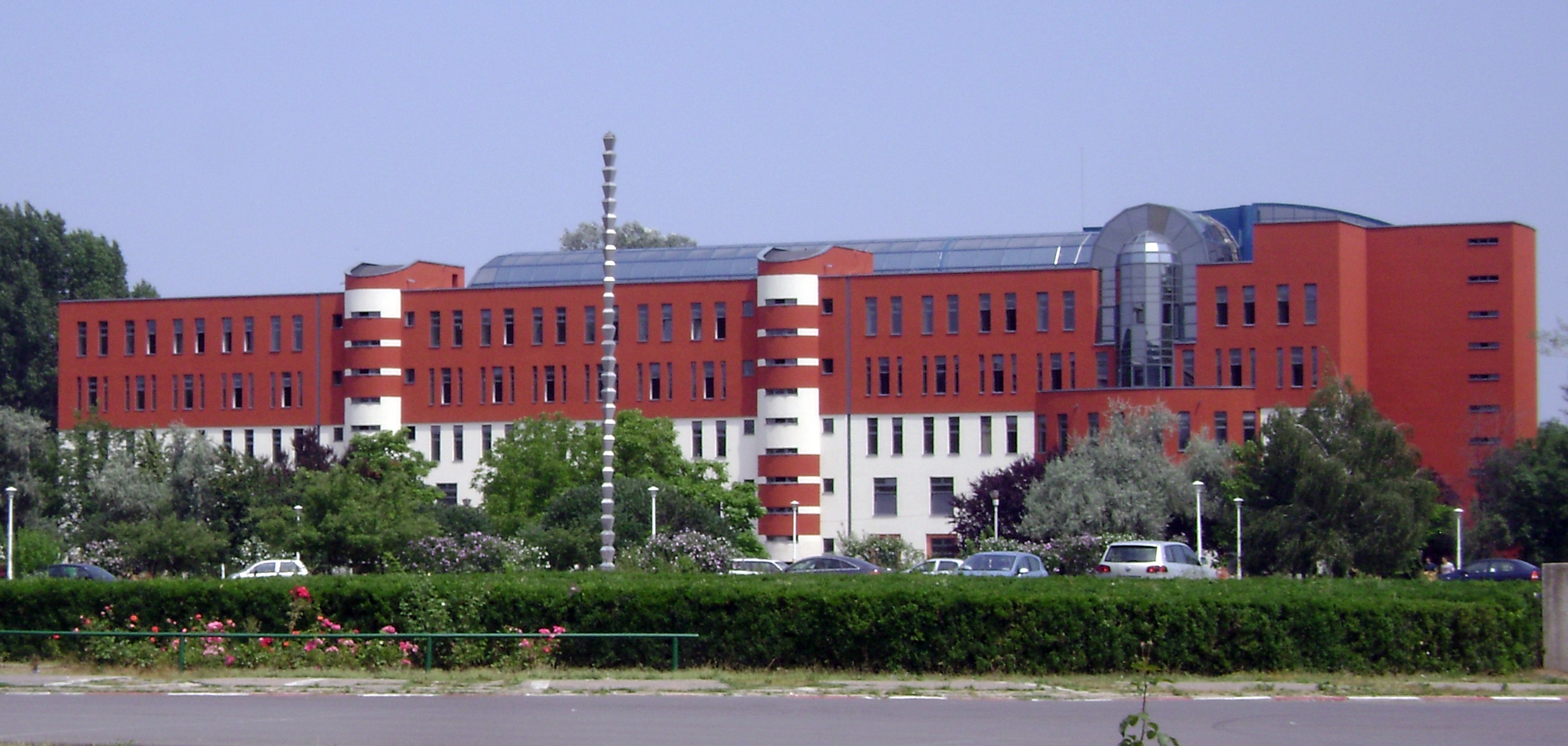
The library building

An important figure in the "School of Bridges, Roads and Mines" was Gheorghe Duca. As early as 1887, he analysed the content of courses, finding the weaknesses of the school, as well as the best solutions to improve its academic level. In those times, a substantial condition was the severity imposed on the conduct of students, in addition to evaluation. Students obtaining insufficient results, or having an erratic course attendance, were quickly removed from the school. Indeed, at the beginning, the preparatory year had no admission tests.

Starting with 1881, an admission test was introduced; the top priority was the quality of candidates, the number of the selected ones being less important. Gheorghe Duca tried and succeeded to bring the best professors to the “National School of Bridges and Roads”; among these were David Emmanuel (Elementary Mathematics), Spiru Haret (Higher Algebra and Analytical Geometry), C. M. Mironescu (Statistics and Engineering Graphics), Constantin Istrati (Physics), or Anghel Saligny (Bridges and Roads). Moreover, Gheorghe Duca himself was considered the greatest authority in railways at the end of the 19th century. This was perhaps a turning moment, when it was clearly demonstrated that Romania was capable of achieving on its own what had been deemed likely to be obtained only abroad, namely the training of highly qualified science and engineering specialists.

The year 1890 also represented a momentous point, when at the National School of Bridges and Roads a new commission was set up. Its main role was to issue equivalency certificates for the engineering diplomas obtained abroad, thus transforming this national school into a model for evaluating higher technical studies.

Nicolae Vasilescu-Karpen was appointed director of the School in February 1920. As a direct result of his endeavors, the government approved the establishment of Polytechnic Schools in Romania, conceived as higher education institutions, similar to universities, having as their final aim engineering training under the Ministry of Public Works.

The Polytechnic School was set up by transforming the "National School of Bridges and Roads" to the "Polytechnic School of Bucharest". In its initial stage it consisted of four sections:

- Civil Engineering;
- Mechanics and Electricity;
- Mines and Metallurgy;
- The Industrial Section.

During this period, in addition to the Polytechnic School, there were Institutes for Engineers within Universities. For instance, the University of Bucharest hosted an institute for electrical engineering, an institute for industrial chemistry and another one for agricultural and food chemistry.

Another important cornerstone was Decree 3799 of 1938 stating that higher education could be provided only by universities, Polytechnic Schools, or Academies for Commercial Studies. As a direct result, the Academy of Higher Agricultural Studies, the Academy of Architecture, the Institute of Industrial Chemistry and Agricultural and Food Chemistry, respectively, were introduced in the framework of "Bucharest Politehnica". The change of name from "Polytechnic School of Bucharest" into "Politehnica Carol II of Bucharest" was accompanied by other changes as well. Thus, Politehnica depended on the Ministry of National Education (instead of the Ministry for Public Works), the former director became Rector of Politehnica, the different sections became Faculties, their presidents in turn, became Deans etc.

Between 1938 and 1948 Politehnica of Bucharest had seven faculties: Civil Engineering, Electro-mechanics, Metallurgy, Industrial Chemistry, Silviculture, Agronomy, and Architecture.

Another important transformation took place in 1948, when several Politehnica or even specialities became independent, or even moved to other cities. Some of the new universities, institutes or faculties had their roots in the old "Politehnica of Bucharest". Thus, the following establishments, were initially faculties or departments at "Politehnica" of Bucharest: Technical University of Civil Engineering of Bucharest; Ion Mincu University of Architecture and Urbanism; University of Agronomic Sciences; Faculty of Forestry - Transilvania University of Brașov; School of Mines - Petroșani; Oil & Gas University of Ploieşti; Faculty for Food Chemistry - University of Galați; Faculty for Textile Industry - Gheorghe Asachi Technical University of Iași.

In 1948–1992, the name of the school was "The Polytechnic Institute of Bucharest". For some years it was called "Institutul Politehnic 'Gheorghe Gheorghiu-Dej' București". Based on a resolution of the Senate (November 1992), the Polytechnic Institute of Bucharest turned into University Politehnica of Bucharest.

== Ranking ==
University rankings

Global – Overall
- QS World: 1201–1400 (2024)
- THE World: 1501+ (2024)
- USNWR Global: =1008 (2023)

According to the Scimago Lab, based on data collected between 2007 and 2011, Politehnica University of Bucharest ranked 546 in the World, 15 regionally and number one in the country by number of publications.

At the 29th annual ACM International Collegiate Programming Contest, held at Shanghai Jiao Tong University, on April 6, 2005, Politehnica student team ranked 10th.

== Faculties ==
The university is structured into faculties. The faculties are distinct academic entities, each having its own admission criteria, largely distinct staff and limited interaction. However, there are a number of commonalities: all the faculties provide only engineering degrees, there is a largely common curricula that is observed in the first year of studies, there are shared teaching facilities and shared student facilities. Teaching is conducted in Romanian and at the Faculty of Engineering in Foreign Languages teaching is conducted in one of the languages: English, French, and German. Currently there are fifteen faculties:

- Faculty of Electrical Engineering;
- Faculty of Power Engineering;
- Faculty of Automation and Computer Science;
- Faculty of Electronics, Telecommunications and Information Technology;
- Faculty of Mechanical Engineering and Mechatronics;
- Faculty of Industrial Engineering and Robotics;
- Faculty of Biotechnical Systems Engineering;
- Faculty of Transports;
- Faculty of Aerospace Engineering;
- Faculty of Material Science and Engineering;
- Faculty of Chemical Engineering and Biotechnologies;
- Faculty of Engineering in Foreign Languages;
- Faculty of Applied Sciences;
- Faculty of Medical Engineering;
- Faculty of Entrepreneurship, Engineering and Business Management.

== Notable faculty and alumni ==
- Elie Carafoli aeronautics engineer
- Henri Coandă
- Octavia Dobre
- Mihai Drăgănescu president of the Romanian Academy between 1990 and 1994
- Traian Lalescu
- Mihail Manoilescu
- Costin Nenițescu
- Aurel Persu
- Peter Stoica member of Royal Swedish Academy of Engineering Sciences, United States National Academy of Engineering (International Member), Romanian Academy (Honorary Member), European Academy of Sciences and Arts, Royal Society of Sciences in Uppsala
- Simion Stoilow
- Gabriel Sudan
- Nicolae Vasilescu-Karpen
- Andrei Alexandrescu regarded as a foremost expert on programming in C++ and D languages, co-developer of D 2.0, head research scientist at Facebook
- Rodica Baranescu past president of SAE international, and a member of the US National Academy of Engineering
- Radu Georgescu software engineer, entrepreneur and founder of GeCAD Software, technology bought by Microsoft that became Windows Security Essentials
- Mihail Roco chair of the US National Science and Technology Council subcommittee on Nanoscale Science, Engineering and Technology (NSET), Senior Advisor for Nanotechnology at the National Science Foundation, founder of National Nanotechnology Initiative
- Dinu Brătianu politician, led the National Liberal Party (PNL) starting with 1934
- Ecaterina Ciorănescu-Nenițescu, chemist
- Silvia Ciornei politician, member in the European Parliament
- Sergiu Cunescu politician
- Ion Iliescu former president of Romania
- Liviu Librescu aeronautics engineer and scientist, hero of the Virginia Tech massacre
- Radu Manicatide engineer and aircraft constructor, inventor of the M.R. microcar
- Mihai Nadin computer scientist, human–computer interaction pioneer, director of the Institute for Research in Anticipatory Systems
- Sergiu Nicolaescu film director
- Ion Mihai Pacepa chemist, general and the highest-ranking intelligence official ever to have defected from the former Eastern Bloc
- Dan Petrescu, Romanian businessman and billionaire, one of the richest persons in Romania at his time
- Cristian Tudor Popescu journalist and science fiction (SF) author
- Vasile Mihai Popov controls engineer
- Dumitru Prunariu cosmonaut, first Romanian in space
- Lawrence Rauchwerger computer scientist
- Dan Roman entrepreneur, investor, information technology (IT) professional
- Petre Roman politician
- George Necula computer scientist
- Ion Stoica computer scientist
- Florin-Teodor Tănăsescu, electrical engineer
- Mihaela Cardei, computer scientist
- Béatrice Pesquet-Popescu, electrical engineer

== See also ==
- List of modern universities in Europe (1801–1945)

== Notes and references ==
The university organizes important conferences such as International Conference on Control Systems and Computer Science and symposiums like Interdisciplinary Approaches in Fractal Analysis.
