= Octavia Dobre =

Canadian engineer

- Born: Crajova, Romania
- Spouse: Adrian Dobre

Academic background
- Education: MSc, PhD, engineering, 2000, Politehnica University of Bucharest
- Thesis: Modele de analiză a perturbaţiilor în canalele de transmiune utilizate în sistemele de telecomandă (1998)

Academic work
- Institutions: Memorial University of Newfoundland; Politehnica University of Bucharest; New Jersey Institute of Technology
- Main interests: Wireless communication
- Website: engr.mun.ca/~dobre/

Octavia Adina Dobre is a Romanian-Canadian engineer. She is a professor and Tier 1 Canada Research Chair in ubiquitous connectivity at Memorial University of Newfoundland. After serving as interim dean of the Faculty of Engineering and Applied Science since May 2022, Dobre was named the permanent dean of the faculty in 2024.

As of 2024, she is a fellow of the Engineering Institute of Canada, Institute of Electrical and Electronics Engineers, Canadian Academy of Engineering, and Royal Society of Canada. Outside of Memorial University of Newfoundland, Dobre is also the editor-in-chief of the IEEE Open Journal of the Communications Society and former editor-in-chief of IEEE Communications Letters. She is also a member of the board of governors of the IEEE Communications Society.

== Early life and education ==
Dobre was born and raised in Crajova, Romania. After earning her Master of Science and PhD in electrical engineering at the Politehnica University of Bucharest, she worked as an assistant professor from 1998 to 2001. Dobre then accepted a one-year Royal Society Scholarship at the University of Westminster and held a Fulbright Fellowship with the Stevens Institute of Technology in the US state of New Jersey.

== Career ==
Following her fellowship, Dobre worked at the Politehnica University of Bucharest and New Jersey Institute of Technology from 2002 until 2005. She then left and accepted a professorship at the Memorial University of Newfoundland in Canada. As an associate professor, Dobre spearheaded the development of Memorial's wireless communications laboratory and was elected to serve on the Institute of Electrical and Electronics Engineers Administrative Committee.

In 2015, she received the President's Outstanding Research Award for her research accomplishments in wireless communication. In January 2016, Dobre was appointed editor-in-chief of the IEEE Communications Letters.
