= List of international subsidiaries of IBM =

IBM has had business internationally since before the company had a name. Early leaders of the companies that would eventually become IBM (Mr Hollerith, Mr Flint, and Mr Watson) all were involved in doing international business.

In those early days, IBM had 70 foreign branches and subsidiaries worldwide. Competitors in the pre-World War II era included Remington Rand, Powers, Bull, NCR, Burroughs, and others.

== European HQ ==
The European headquarters for IBM was originally in Paris. In 1935, Watson moved it to Geneva. The managers included Schotte, and later the controversial Werner Lier (see #Switzerland).

== Austria ==
IBM was represented in Austria by Furth & Company until 1933, when a direct subsidiary was created. IBM did the 1934 Austrian census. A card-printing plant was built later. Germany annexed Austria in 1938. In late May, Thomas J Watson went to Berlin and got IBM's German subsidiary, Dehomag, to replace IBM's Austrian subsidiary. Dehomag would go on to perform the May 1939 Reich Census, which included Austria and other areas Germany had invaded at the time.

== Belgium ==
IBM's subsidiary in Belgium was named Watson Belge. The director was Emile Genon, formerly of Groupe Bull, a competing punch-card firm. When the US entered the World War II in 1941, the company ownership was taken by the Nazi government and given to a custodian, H. Gabrecht, who also custodied the Netherlands subsidiary. He allowed Bosman and Galland to keep running the company, and he coordinated with Hermann Fellinger, custodian of Dehomag.

During the war the Nazi Maschinelles Berichtswesen (Mechanical Reporting) department took machines from Belgium to use in other parts of the Reich. Custodian Gabrecht worked on the contracts for these takings, so that the owner, IBM NY, would eventually be properly paid for the machine's use.

== Bulgaria ==
IBM's Bulgarian subsidiary was called Watson Business Machines Corporation, Ltd. It started in Sofia in March 1938. During the war, Germany invaded Bulgaria, thus it became illegal for IBM NY and IBM Geneva to transact with the subsidiary in 'enemy territory' (per General Ruling 11). In 1942, the Bulgarian government blocked payment from its railroads to the subsidiary, and bankruptcy threatened. Lier of IBM Geneva asked the State Department for help to get money to the subsidiary; State refused. By unknown means the subsidiary survived and continued to provide punch card based scheduling to the railroads. After the war, in 1945, the subsidiary was again allowed to transact with IBM, which filed a war compensation claim and requested access to its Sofia bank accounts.

Please also see: Holocaust in Bulgaria

== Canada ==
Information Systems Management Corporation (ISM Canada) was formed through the merger of Westbridge Computer Corp and STM Systems Corp. The official opening of the new head office at 1 Research Drive, Regina. IBM assumed a controlling financial interest in ISM Canada. IBM outsourced its internal computer operations (host and client-server systems) to ISM. ISM ranked as one of the top 500 Canadian companies, moving up almost 300 places in the survey by Commerce magazine.

In 1995, ISM Canada became 100% owned by IBM.

== China ==
IBM had an office in Shanghai. When Japan invaded during World War II, they took an IBM machine back to Kobe.

== Czechoslovakia ==
IBM opened an office in Prague circa 1933, a sales school in 1935, and a card printing plant soon after. A big customer was the Czechoslovak State Railways. Schneider joined in 1937, moved to Berlin, and back to Prague in 1939. In the war, custodian Hermann Fellinger let E. Kuczek continue to run the company. The Czech subsidiary supplied cards to IBM's German subsidiary, Dehomag, while Dehomag supplied it equipment. The Nazis took some machines from Czechoslovakia to railways in the East, and Kuczek put the rental money in Prague Kreditbank.

== France ==
In 1919, CTR (which became IBM later) opened a sales office in Paris. In 1925, IBM France opened a factory and a branch. By 1932 it had 65 customers, including the Ministry of War. IBM France did not grow as fast as the other European subsidiaries. There were two competitors in those days, Powers and Bull. Watson moved on Bull by purchasing its Swiss rights and hiring away a Bull manager. Bull sued for unfair competition.

In 1936, Compagnie Electro-Comptabe de France (CEC) was created. Its customers were mostly banks, railroad and the military. CEC grew and built many factories in France.

Germany invaded France in 1940. The Nazis (especially their Maschinelles Berichtswesen department) took hundreds of CEC's machines for use elsewhere in the Reich. Many of CEC's operations were moved, as was the paper CEC needed for punchcards. CEC almost became part of a planned Nazi competitor to IBM, but the plan fell through. CEC's Nazi Kommissar was an SS man named Westerholt.

At this time CEC had offices in French colonies such as Algeria, Casablanca, and Indochina. CEC also worked with Vichy France's Demographic Department to perform a census. However the department was run by René Carmille, a secret agent of the French underground, who failed to punch the 'Jewish' hole on the census cards, and instead used his operation to mobilize French resistance troops in Algeria.

== Germany ==
Before World War I, when IBM was called CTR, it had a business in Germany. During that war, the German government seized the company as 'enemy property'. However, Germany's alien custody laws protected enemy assets via an Alien Property Custodian. Thus CTRs assets were returned to it in good condition after the war.

In 1922, there was a rival company named Dehomag, run by Willy Heidinger, who had brought Holleriths to Germany back in 1910. Dehomag licensed machines from CTR (later IBM). When Germany's currency suddenly lost almost all of its value due to the German hyperinflation of the 1920s, Dehomag suddenly found itself owing enormous sums of money to CTR. Watson bought 90% of the shares of Dehomag. The remaining 10% of shares were 'specialized' with various rules to make it hard for them to be sold, and Heidinger was given these. Dehomag became a subsidiary of CTR (later IBM). It performed much better than IBM's other subsidiaries.

There were also IBM subsidiaries called Degemag, Optima, and Holgemag. They were merged into Dehomag in the early 1930s.

Dehomag got a contract to do the 1933 Prussian census via their lawyer Karl Koch. Watson visited in 1933, and made a deal with Heidinger that allowed Dehomag to do business in territories that were already covered by other IBM subsidiaries.

The Nazi Party came to power in 1933. It banned foreign corporations from transmitting income back to their home countries. Dehomag's profits would sit in blocked bank accounts in, for example, Deutsche Bank und Disconto-Gesellschaft. However money did flow from Dehomag to IBM NY, in the form of 'royalty' payments (classified as a 'necessary expense').

In 1933, Heidinger claimed that Dehomag was working with the Sturmabteilung for the compilation of 'certain necessary statistics'<pg 78>

A new Dehomag factory was started up in 1934 at Lichterfelde. Attendants at opening included Watson's representative Walter Jones, Heidinger of Dehomag, Rudolf Schmeer, Deputy Leader of the German Labor Front, Artur Görlitzer, Deputy Gauleiter of Berlin, directors of financial institutions, like the Reichsbank, the Police, Post Office, Ministry of Defense, Reich Statistical Office, and Reichsbahn.

Applications included payroll, inventory, personnel, finance, scheduling, manufacturing supervision, and many others. Customers came from all over government and industry, including IG Farben, Zeiss Ikon, Siemens, Daimler-Benz, Junkers, Krupp, Deutsche Bank, public works departments, statistical offices, the Reichsbahn railroad, and many others.

Watson authorized a lawsuit by Heidinger against competitor punch-card company Powers, on the basis that Powers was not 'German' enough, something that was problematic in the days of the Nazis. In 1934, Powers lost the case.

Heidinger was enthusiastic about Adolf Hitler's plans. At the opening of a new IBM facility, he spoke of Hitler as a physician who would 'correct' the 'sick circumstances' of the 'German cultural body', by using Dehomag's statistical surveys of the population. Watson congratulated him on his speech.

In 1947, an attempt was made to change the name to IBM Germany. In East Germany Dehomag was not allowed to reincorporate and most of Dehomag's assets accumulated in the east of the Third Reich were nationalised. In contrast, in the western occupied zones a strong postwar Dehomag in the hands of an IBM was seen as desirable by the Allies for databases and administration as the Cold War began, and was indeed business as usual what with IBM systems in place in many areas of Western Allies' war theatre. By 1949, West Germany was established and the name was changed to IBM Deutschland.

== The Netherlands ==
IBM did a very large amount of business in the Netherlands (for example opening a card printing plant in 1936) but did not incorporate a subsidiary until March 1940. This was Watson Bedrijfsmachine Maatschappij N.V. of 34 Frederiksplein, Amsterdam.

In May 1940, Germany invaded the Netherlands. Dutch statistical expert Jacobus Lambertus Lentz (company motto: 'To Record is to Serve'), of the Dutch Population Registry, used IBM solutions to work on the Decree VO6/41 of 1941 which ordered all Jews to register at the census office. In 1941, IBM NY also sent 132 million punch cards to the Netherlands.

In December 1941 (after Japan bombed Pearl Harbor), the US entered the war, and IBM was legally restricted from doing business with its subsidiaries in enemy-controlled territory. The Netherlands' IBM subsidiary was custodied by H Garbrecht, who also custodied IBM's subsidiary in Belgium. When the Reich took machines from the Netherlands for use elsewhere, Garbrecht ensured that these machines were properly counted so that IBM would be paid properly.

== Italy ==
The Italian subsidiary was named Watson Italiana. During the war it coordinated its work with Fellinger, custodian of German subsidiary Dehomag.

== Japan ==
IBM entered the Japanese market in the 1925 and supplied adding machines to Mitsubishi Shipbuilding. Its competitor was Powers Tabulating Machine (via the Mitsumi Trading Company). Powers (later Remington Rand) would remain a stiff competitor, preferred by the Japanese government, until after World War II.

IBM had a rocky start as the 'rental' business model did not fit into Japanese business culture of the 1920s. Morimura Brothers tried to represent IBM but soon abandoned the idea. Kurosawa Trading became the representative from 1927 until 1937, when IBM opened an actual subsidiary. In the 1930s IBM had success with Japan Life Insurance and Imperial Life Insurance.

In 1937, Mr Holt and Mr Chevalerie visited and on their decision an actual subsidiary was formed in Yokohama. It was called Nihon Watson Tokei Kaikei Kikai (also called Nihon Watson Computing Machines, Watson Tabulating Machines, or Japan Watson) and Chevalerie ran it until 1941. The same year it opened a manufacturer in Yokohama that would eventually make 'computer cards'. Japanese people were hired as managers and employees, especially as war approached. Card production was aided by advice from a man from Dehomag

In 1939, IBM Japan was involved in the aircraft business. In that year punch-card production actually came on line.

When Japan invaded Indochina (Vietnam) in 1940, IBM Japan helped IBM NY contact its Hanoi office, which had been out of touch.

As the US-Japan war approached, Japan's government restricted imports of IBM equipment as well as exports of royalty money. Chevalerie was replaced by Mizushina Ko. Its assets were frozen in mid-1941. IBM Japan, cut off from IBM NY, continued to maintain and collect rental payments during the war. It produced punch cards until 1943. Its customers included insurance companies, government agencies, Mitsubishi Heavy Industries, the Japanese Army, and the Japanese Navy.

In 1942, it was declared an 'enemy company' and Jinushi Ennosuke became custodian. In 1943, Tokyo Electric (Toshiba) bought its assets and business. Ennosuke put the money in the Yokohama Specie Bank. Later on, Mitsubishi Trust became custodian.

Mizushina Ko was jailed on spy suspicions but later worked for the Navy who wanted help with coded communications. Ko worked at Kobe, where Japan held machines seized from occupied territories, including a tabulator the Americans lost to Japan at Corregidor and one taken from Shanghai, China.

During the war, Toshiba formed JTM which started making its own punch cards. JTM and others also made copies of IBM machinery.

After the war ended in 1945, IBM negotiated with SCAP and others to get its property back. It also got 'royalty and dividends' money from JTM, for all the time JTM had been doing business with machinery it had seized from IBM. T. Kevin Mallen, IBM Far East General Manager, continued the process. IBM recovered the money Ennosuke had put away. IBM was still highly restricted by the Japanese government until a thaw circa the late 1950s.

== Norway ==
The subsidiary in Norway was called IBM Norsk. Before the war, its stock ownership was put under Norwegian and other non-American men, to avoid Nazi anger (and possible takeover) after Watson's rejection of a medal Hitler had given him in the late 1930s.

Norway was one of the countries under sway of German Dehomag custodian Fellinger, who helped manager Jens Tellefson deal with the Reich.

IBM Norsk's offices were blown up by saboteurs attempting to disrupt the Nazi Labor Office's slave labor campaign. However, Tellefson had kept backups. The office was moved after this incident.

== Poland ==
IBM originally did not have a subsidiary in Poland but instead was represented by the Block-Brun agency. In 1934, Watson formed a subsidiary, Polski Hollerith. Black claims this was to compete with the Powers Corporation which had just gotten the Polish post office contract. In 1935, an office was started in Katowice in the Upper Silesia area of Poland. A card printing facility was set up in Warsaw. In 1937, Polski Hollerith was renamed Watson Business Machines sp. z. o.o. Customers included the Polish Postal Service, Polish Ministry of Railroads, and about 25 others.

In 1939, (after the German and Soviet invasions of Poland), the business in Upper Silesia was given to IBM's German subsidiary, Dehomag. Watson Business Machines sp. z. o.o. was reincorporated as Watson Büromaschien GmbH, given a German manager, and given a new area to work in: what the Nazis called the 'General Government' section of Poland. It had an account at the Handlowy Bank, Warsaw. In 1940, Watson gave the families of employees extra money.

Watson Büromaschien and Dehomag both worked with the Nazi government, especially the Maschinelles Berichtswesen. Dehomag was in charge of leasing, training, upkeep, and application design. Watson Büromaschien had its printing office at Rymarska 6, which wound up being right across the street from the Warsaw Ghetto. It participated in the December 1939 census of Poland, which SD chief Heydrich wrote would be 'the basis for the evacuation' of Poles and Jews. These two companies also provided solutions to the railroads, which transported people to death camps.

After the war, IBM NY asked the State Department to protect its bank accounts in Bank Handlowy, Bank Emisyjny, and the post office.

== Romania ==
IBM's Romanian subsidiary was Compania Electrocontabila Watson, incorporated in 1938 in Bucharest. Its customers included railroads, census, statistics offices, and the communication ministry. Bucharest had an IBM Swift Press card printing facility as well. The company helped the Romanian Central Statistical Institute in the Romanian Census of 1941 April, including the special 'Jewish census'. A problem occurred when there were not enough machines to do the job. Lier, with the help of US Commercial Attaché Sam Woods and the Romanian Commercial Attaché, got the Nazi government (including the Devisenstelle) to ship some machines from German-occupied Poland to Romania. The census proceeded. In December 1941, the US entered the war and Romania came under General Rule 11 so interaction with IBM NY and IBM Geneva was restricted. After the war in 1945, IBM submitted requests to the State Department to secure its Romanian bank accounts, and sent compensation claims for damaged equipment.

After the falling of the communist regime in December 1989, IBM started a commercial partnership with RBS Ltd. (Romanian Business Systems), one of the first private companies in the country. After consolidation of the market leader position, IBM acquired RBS Ltd. in 1995, and Dan Roman, CEO and owner of the company, became the first Country General Manager of IBM Romania.

== Russia / Soviet Union ==
Hollerith got a contract to work on the Russian census of Tsar Nicholas II in 1896. His Tabulating Machine Company would later become CTR, then IBM.

In the late 1930s the Stalina Automobile Plant was a major user of IBM punch cards.

In 1937, (during the Stalin's Great Purge) US ambassador Joseph E. Davies appealed to the Soviet government on behalf of an IBM employee who was working there. He also wrote of IBM that "It has had a long-continued business relationship with different branches of the Soviet government, which relations, I understand, have always been pleasant."

When Germany overran the Soviet Union during Operation Barbarossa, it seized spare parts from IBM machines that it found there.

The Soviets took machines from the part of Germany that they occupied back to the Soviet Union after the war.

- See also: Five-year plans of the Soviet Union § Information technology

== Sweden ==
The Swedish subsidiary was called Svenska Watson. It sold paper cards to other subsidiaries in 1939.

== Switzerland ==
In 1935, European IBM Headquarters switched from Paris to Geneva.

IBM Geneva was run by Werner C. Lier. IBM NY internal investigations revealed Lier was lying and falsifying dates to cover up IBM Geneva trading with companies blacklisted by the State Department during the war. Lier was not fired. After the war, Lier tried to leave Geneva. He was denied a French transit visa and initially denied entry into the United States on grounds he was a danger to public safety. However Military Attaché Barnwell Legge and Consul General Sam Woods helped him get around these problems and enter the US.

Black writes that IBM subsidiaries in neutral countries continued to supply cards to subsidiaries in enemy territory during the war. He also alleges that they traded with blacklisted companies and sometimes directly with Germany and Italy.

== Vietnam ==
French IBM ran IBM's office in Hanoi but lost contact. When Japan invaded Indochina in 1940, IBM Japan was able to help IBM NY contact the office again.

== Yugoslavia ==
Subsidiary Yugoslav Watson AG began before World War II. It was put under a Nazi custodian during the war. V Bajkic kept running the company. He coordinated with Edmund Veesenmayer, who was a Dehomag advisor and affiliated with the Ustashi (pro-Nazis in Croatia, a part of Yugoslavia). Customers included the Yugoslav Army, Commerce Ministry, and Railroads. Machines were taken by the Reich and moved to Germany before the Soviets came to Yugoslavia as the war turned against Germany. Yugoslav Watson AG sent bills to the Reich, who remitted payments to them until 1945. After the war, the Nazi custodian gave a payment to US Army Property Control Officer Reed for transmittal to IBM NY. IBM also asked the State Department for help retrieving its assets and its money in Jugobank Belgrade.

== German Alien property laws and World War II ==
Germany operated under a system of 'alien property laws' and 'custodianship' during times of war. That is, if a foreign company of an enemy owned property in Germany (or, in addition, in countries Germany had taken over) during a war, Germany's government would appoint a 'custodian' to look after the company and its property. After the war, the company and its assets were to be returned to its owner. This in fact had already happened to Mr Thomas J Watson during World War I. And as World War II began, a similar regime came into being, with the Nazi government of Germany appointing custodians over foreign companies, including IBM. There were also sometimes management changes. For example, IBM's German subsidiary Dehomag got the notable Dr Edmund Veesenmayer, who, amongst other things, oversaw the holocaust in Hungary.

The US government banned US companies from dealing with subsidiaries in enemy territory during the war. It did this by many means, including the law known as General Rule 11. When that rule was lifted for a country, IBM frequently would ask for compensation claims for damaged equipment, it would often ask about company performance during the war for inclusion of employees into the Hundred Percent Club, and it would also try to secure the bank accounts that the subsidiary had used to store its money during the war.

== See also ==
- IBM and the Holocaust
- History of IBM
- Nazi eugenics
