= Costin Nenițescu =

Romanian chemist

Costin D. Nenițescu
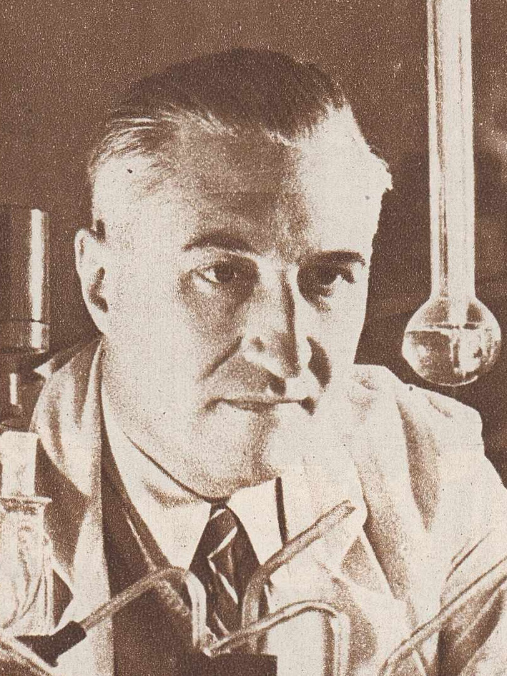
- Nenițescu in 1956
- Born: 15 July 1902; Bucharest, Kingdom of Romania
- Died: 28 July 1970 (aged 68); Bușteni, Socialist Republic of Romania
- Resting place: Bellu Cemetery, Bucharest
- Education: ETH Zurich; LMU Munich
- Known for: Nenitzescu indole synthesis
- Spouse: Ecaterina Ciorănescu-Nenițescu
- Parents: Dimitrie S. Nenițescu (father); Elena Nenițescu (mother)
- Relatives: Ioan S. Nenițescu (uncle)
- Scientific career
- Institutions: University of Bucharest; Politehnica University of Bucharest
- Thesis: Beitrag zum Aufbau der saueren Spaltprodukte des Blutfarbstoffs (1925)
- Doctoral advisor: Hans Fischer

Costin D. Nenițescu (in some places Nenitzescu (Romanian pronunciation: [kosˈtin neniˈt͡sesku]); 15 July 1902 – 28 July 1970) was a prominent Romanian chemist, and a professor at the Politehnica University of Bucharest. He was a titular member of the Romanian Academy, a corresponding member of the German Academy of Sciences in Berlin, and a member of the Leopoldina Academy of Natural Scientists in Halle-Saale.

== Early life ==
He was born in Bucharest, the son of Dimitrie S. Nenițescu (lawyer and politician, director of the National Bank of Romania and Minister of Industry and Commerce) and Elena Nenițescu, and the nephew of the writer Ioan S. Nenițescu. After completing in 1920 his secondary studies at Gheorghe Lazăr High School, Nenițescu continued his studies at the Polytechnic Institute in Zurich and the Ludwig-Maximilians-Universität München (LMU) in Munich, where he completed in 1935 his Ph.D. under the direction of Hans Fischer, with thesis regarding the synthesis of degradation products of blood pigments.

== Career ==
Upon returning to Romania, he became a professor at the University of Bucharest from 1925 to 1935. He studied Friedel–Crafts-like reactions in the series of aliphatic hydrocarbons, the mechanism of the isomerization of cyclobasics, the halogen migration in cycles and chains, reactions induced by carbonium ions, and others. He identified a group of naphthenic acids in Romanian oil. He searched for ways of obtaining cyclobutadiene, while explaining the chemistry of this unstable substance and isolating its dimers.

His research interests included the oxidation of open-chain and aromatic hydrocarbons with chromic acid and chromic oxychloride. He found new methods for the synthesis of pyrylium salts (Balaban–Nenitzescu–Praill synthesis), of carbenes, tryptamine, serotonin, two new syntheses for the indole nucleus, and a new method of polymerisation of ethylene.

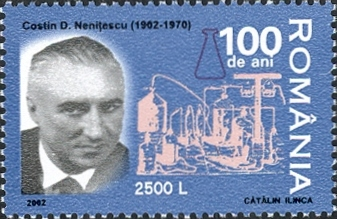
Stamp of Romania from 2002 commemorating the 100th anniversary of Nenițescu's birth

His research was substantiated in more than 200 papers. His remarkable technical and scientific activity helped develop the chemical industry in Romania. A preferred quote is:

"To be able to convey science you have to be yourself a creative scientist, or at least you should strive to be".

Nenițescu was elected corresponding member of the Romanian Academy in 1945 and a titular member in 1955. In 1969, he was nominated for the Nobel Prize in Chemistry "for discovering two new syntheses for the indolenucleus, and a new method of polymerisation of ethylene".

== Personal life and legacy ==
He was married to Ecaterina Ciorănescu-Nenițescu (1909–2000). A student of his, she obtained her Ph.D. in chemistry in 1936, became a professor at Politehnica University, and was elected titular member of the Romanian Academy in 1974. The family lived in a house located at 8, Strada Școalei, in central Bucharest. Built by his father in 1908 in the Romanian Revival style, the house was declared a historic monument in 2010, but was abandoned soon after and caught fire in 2016.

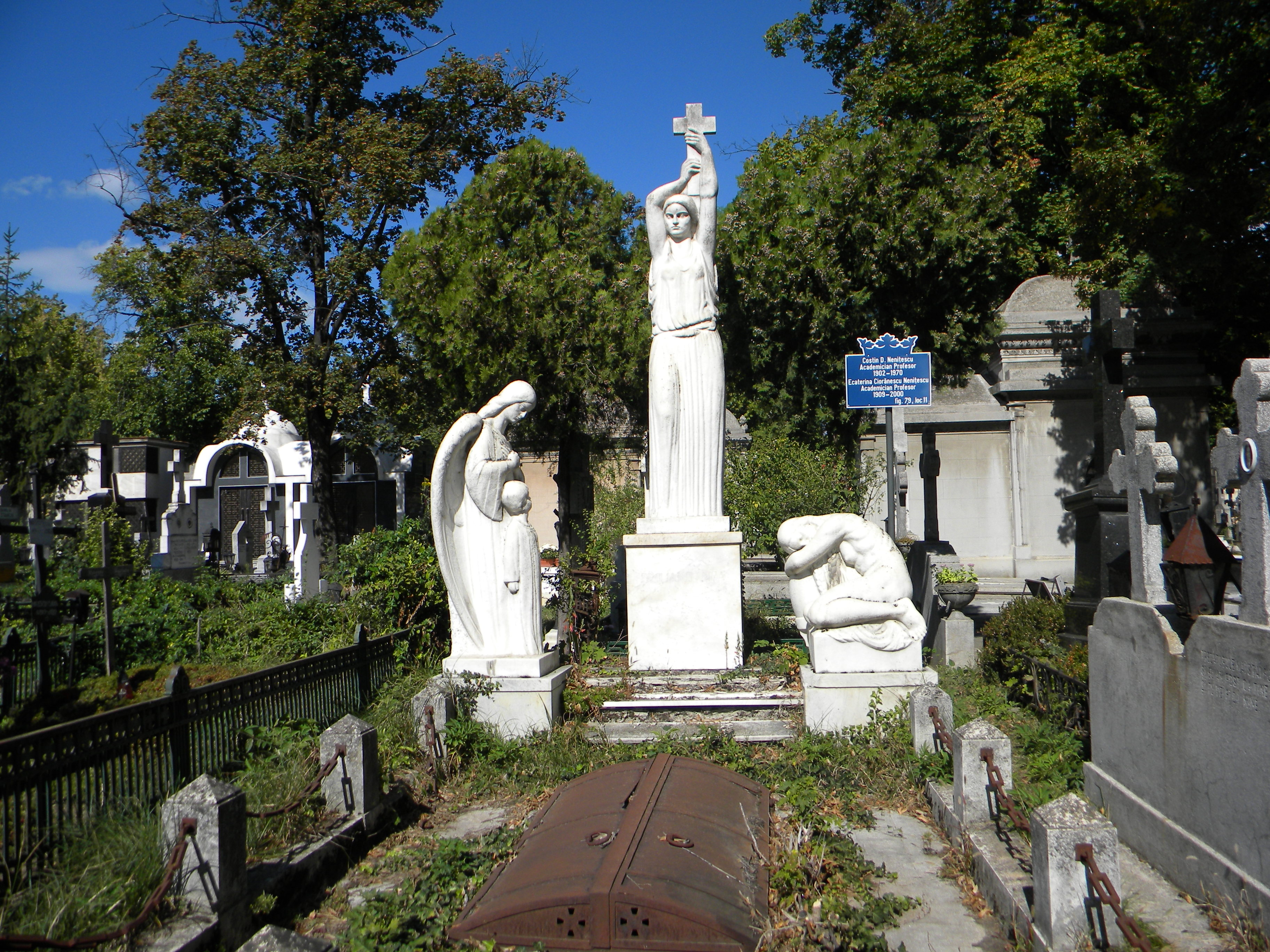
Grave of Nenițescu and his wife at Bellu Cemetery in Bucharest

He died in Bușteni at age 68 and was buried at Bellu Cemetery in Bucharest. In his honor, the chemistry contest "C.D. Nenițescu" is organized yearly at the Polytechnic University of Bucharest. The Costin D. Nenițescu Technical College in Pitești bears his name. A street in Sector 6 of Bucharest is also named after him.

== Works ==
- Fischer, Hans; Nenitzescu, Costin (1924). "Synthesen der Phyllo‐pyrrol‐carbonsäure". Justus Liebigs Annalen der Chemie. 439 (1): 175–184. doi:10.1002/jlac.19244390110.
- Nenitzescu, Costin (10 June 1925). "Über eine neue Indol‐Synthese". Berichte der deutschen chemischen Gesellschaft (A and B Series). 58 (6): 1063–1064. doi:10.1002/cber.19250580613.
- Nenitzescu, Costin D. (1929). "Derivatives of 2-methyl-5-hydroxyindole". Buletinul Societății de Chimie din România. 11: 37–43.
- Organic Chemistry (2 volumes; 1st print was in 1928; the 6th print was published in 1965)
- General Chemistry (2nd print was published in 1963).

== See also ==
- Nenitzescu indole synthesis
