= Rodica Baranescu =

Romanian-American mechanical engineer

- Born: 1940 (age 85–86)
- Education: Politehnica University of Bucharest
- Engineering career
- Discipline: Mechanical engineering
- Institutions: University of Illinois at Chicago
- Significant design: Internal Combustion Engine with Damping Chamber; Accumulator Fuel Injection System for Diesel Engine

Rodica A. Baranescu (Romanian: Bărănescu; born 1940) is a Romanian-American mechanical engineer known for her research in automotive diesel engines. Specifically she focuses on alternative fuels and optimization in emissions and performance of the engines.

Baranescu was elected a member of the National Academy of Engineering in 2001 for research leading to effective and environmentally sensitive diesel and alternative-fuel engines and leadership in automotive engineering.

== Early life and education ==
Baranescu earned her B.S. in Mechanical Engineering from the French Institute of Petroleum in Rueil-Malmaison, France. She earned her M.S. in Mechanical Engineering (1961) and her Ph.D. in Mechanical Engineering (1970) from Politehnica University in Bucharest, Romania.

== Career and research ==
After her formal education Baranescu taught as an assistant, and then associate professor at Politehnica University from 1964 to 1978. In 1980 she moved to the United States to work for the International Truck and Engine Corporation where she eventually became Chief Engineer for Engine Performance Analysis. She also became a manager in the Fuels and Lubricants and Engine group for the same company.

In 2005 she became a Professor in the Department of Mechanical and Industrial Engineering at the University of Illinois at Chicago. Here she served as a mentor and research director to graduate and undergraduate students in engineering. She retired from her position in 2016.

Baranescu was often invited as a speaker and lecturer worldwide to talk about her research in the automotive industry. She is the co-editor of the 1999 edition of the Diesel Engine Reference Book and author of many papers relating to fuels and energy, mobile technology, and environmental issues. Her success has led her to be the first woman president of SAE International (SAE) which is the largest automotive society in the world. She is also the Chair of the Fluids group in the Engine Manufacturers Association (EMA). Through her leadership at SAE she has promoted engineering education for young students, women, and minorities. In 2011 SAE announced an award in her name to honor and celebrate the successes of women in the engineering profession.

== Awards ==
- Member of the National Academy of Engineering (NAE)
- Doctor Honoris Causa of the University of Pitești in Romania
- Fellow member of SAE International
- Honorary Professor of Transylvania University in Brașov, Romania
- ASME Internal Combustion Engine Award
- Excellence in Oral Presentation at the SAE International Off-Highway Engineering Conference
- Powerplant Congress and Exposition
- Gold Award of Excellence for the Chicago Section of SAE
- Forest R. McFarland Award of SAE

== Patents ==
- Internal Combustion Engine with Damping Chamber
- Accumulator Fuel Injection System for Diesel Engine
