= Helen Watson Buckner =

American philanthropist (1918–1991)

Helen W. Buckner
- Born: Helen Watson; 1918
- Died: February 21, 1991 (aged 72–73); Gulf Stream, Florida, U.S.
- Occupation: Philanthropist
- Spouse: Walker Gentry Buckner
- Children: 4

Helen Watson Buckner (1918 – February 21, 1991) was an American philanthropist. The daughter of Thomas J. Watson, the American businessman credited with IBM's massive expansion from 1914 to 1956, she was born into great wealth. She died after a stroke on 20 February 1991.

Her engagement to Walker Buckner was announced in 1940.

She spent most of her life working with various organizations, including as a member of the Salvation Army's advisory board, the vice chairwoman of the board of managers of the New York Botanical Garden, a trustee of the Brick Presbyterian Church, and a board member of the Young Women's Christian Association.
