= Ecaterina Ciorănescu-Nenițescu =

Romanian chemist (1909–2000)

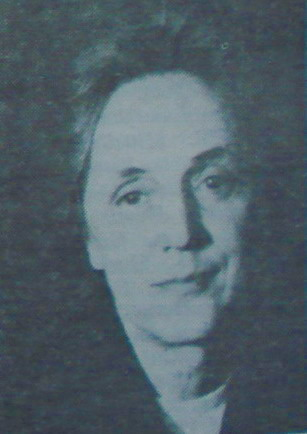
- Born: 15 August 1909; Bucharest, Kingdom of Romania
- Died: 23 January 2000 (aged 90); Bucharest, Romania
- Education: University of Bucharest
- Spouse: Costin Nenițescu
- Scientific career
- Workplaces: Bucharest Polytechnic Institute; Institute of Oil and Gas
- Doctoral advisor: Costin Nenițescu

Ecaterina Ciorănescu-Nenițescu (15 August 1909 – 23 January 2000) was a Romanian chemist. She was a titular member of the Romanian Academy and established the Organic Chemistry Laboratory at the Institute of Oil and Gas in Bucharest.

== Biography ==
Ciorănescu-Nenițescu was born on 15 August 1909 in Bucharest, Kingdom of Romania. Her father was educator Ion Ciorănescu, and she had four brothers: Alexandru Ciorănescu [ro], George Ciorănescu [ro], Ioan Ciorănescu [ro] and Nicolae Ciorănescu [ro].

Ciorănescu-Nenițescu studied at the Faculty of Physics and Chemistry at the University of Bucharest, being awarded her PhD in 1931. Her thesis was supervised by Costin Nenițescu, who she later married.

After graduating, Ciorănescu-Nenițescu became the first female assistant at the Department of Organic Chemistry of the Bucharest Polytechnic Institute. From 1947 to 1954 she worked as a Professor at the Institute of Oil and Gas in Bucharest, where she established the Organic Chemistry Laboratory.

Ciorănescu-Nenițescu wrote the first Romanian paper in the field of synthetic drugs. She authored studies on organic synthesis and technology, developing synthesis processes for antituberculosis drugs and insecticides. She also created new substances using cytostatic grafting.

In 1971, Ciorănescu-Nenițescu became a member of the New York Chemical Society and the Tiberina Academy [it] in Rome, Italy. She was elected as a titular member of the Romanian Academy in 1974, after becoming a correspondent in 1963.

Ciorănescu-Nenițescu died on 23 January 2000 in Bucharest, Romania, aged 90.
