= IBM and the Holocaust =

2001 book by Edwin Black

- Paperback expanded edition cover
- Author: Edwin Black
- Original title: IBM and the Holocaust: The Strategic Alliance between Nazi Germany and America's Most Powerful Corporation
- Language: English
- Genre: Non-fiction
- Publisher: Dialog Press
- Publication date: 2001, 2002, 2008, 2012 (expanded edition with documents), and 2021 (updated 20th anniversary)
- Publication place: United States
- ISBN: 9780914153283 (2012)
- OCLC: 49419235
- Website: Official website

IBM and the Holocaust: The Strategic Alliance between Nazi Germany and America's Most Powerful Corporation is a book by investigative journalist and historian Edwin Black which documents the strategic technology services rendered by US-based multinational corporation International Business Machines (IBM) and its German and other European subsidiaries for the government of Adolf Hitler from the beginning of the Third Reich through to the last day of the regime, at the end of World War II when the US and Germany were at war with each other.

Published in 2001, with numerous subsequent expanded editions, Black outlined the key role of IBM's technology in the Holocaust genocide committed by the German Nazi regime, by facilitating the regime's generation and tabulation of punched cards for national census data, military logistics, ghetto statistics, train traffic management, and concentration camp capacity.

== Summary ==
In the early 1880s, Herman Hollerith, an employee of the U.S. Census Bureau, created punched cards with standardized perforations. Each hole represented traits such as gender, nationality, or occupation. The cards could be sorted mechanically to produce statistical portraits of the population. A circuit-closing device recorded the data and allowed searches by trait.

In 1910, Willy Heidinger founded the Deutsche Hollerith Maschinen Gesellschaft (Dehomag), IBM’s German licensee. Hollerith sold his U.S. company the next year to Charles Ranlett Flint for US$1.41 million. The firm became part of the new Computing-Tabulating-Recording Company (CTR), led by salesman Thomas J. Watson. CTR acquired Dehomag outright in 1923, and in 1924 Watson renamed CTR as International Business Machines (IBM).

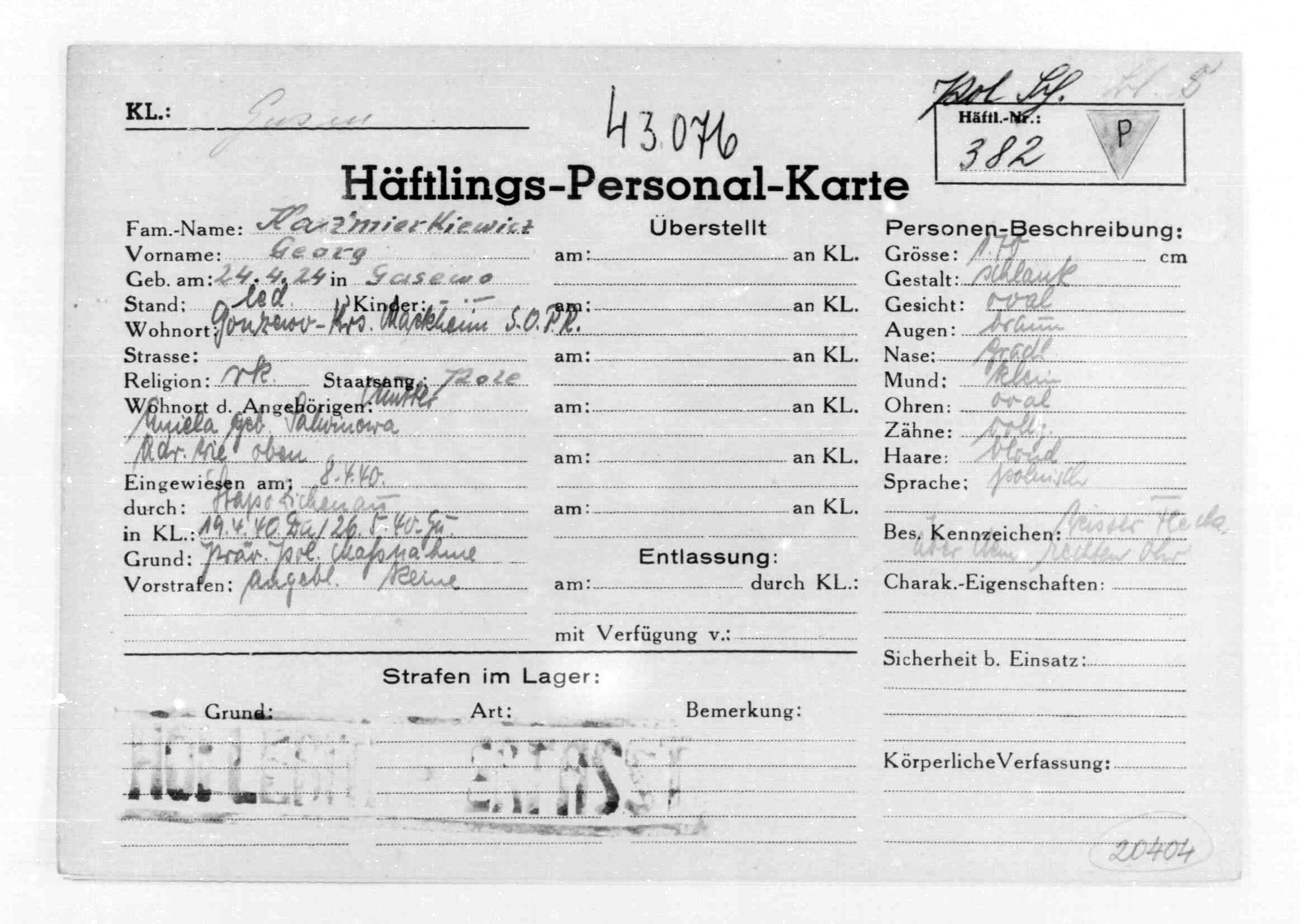
A Mauthausen-Gusen concentration camp file of an individual. The stamp apparently says 'HOLLERITH ERFASST' (Recorded by Hollerith) which was stamped on many Personal Information Cards after they had been entered into an IBM Hollerith punch card system, as documented in "IBM and the Holocaust" by Edwin Black.

=== Relationship with Nazi Germany ===
According to Black, IBM maintained business ties with the Nazi regime after Adolf Hitler took power in January 1933. Repression of political opponents and Jews began immediately; by April, about 60,000 had been imprisoned. A concentration camp was opened at Dachau in March 1933. Despite international boycott calls, IBM continued to operate in Germany, and Heidinger openly supported the new government.

In April 1933, the government announced a national census to identify Jews, Roma, and other groups. Black reports that Dehomag offered its services in Prussia and that Watson approved new investments, raising IBM’s capital in Germany from 400,000 to 7 million Reichsmarks. The funds financed IBM’s first German factory in Berlin. Black also describes a “secret deal” between Watson and Heidinger giving Dehomag authority to serve IBM clients outside Germany, and argues that Germany soon became IBM’s second-largest market. He states that the 1933 census, using IBM machines, raised the official estimate of Jews in Germany from roughly half a million to about two million.

=== Expansion during World War II ===
Black contends that as German forces occupied other countries, IBM subsidiaries in Germany and Poland supplied equipment for new censuses. He writes that these operations aided the identification and concentration of Jewish populations. He further states that every concentration camp maintained a Hollerith department to track prisoners and concludes that the camps could not have processed their numbers without IBM’s machines, service, and cards.

==== Operations in occupied Poland ====
Black later wrote that IBM New York created a subsidiary in Poland, Watson Business Machines, after the 1939 invasion. The firm managed railway traffic in the General Government and ran a punch-card printing shop near the Warsaw Ghetto. He stated that this subsidiary reported through Geneva to IBM New York, and revenues were transferred accordingly.

=== Leasing and servicing model ===
Black emphasizes that IBM leased, rather than sold, its machines. The company retained control of punch-card supply and provided service through subsidiaries. Each set of cards was custom-designed to Nazi requirements. He later wrote that the IBM headquarters in New York oversaw these arrangements through subsidiaries across Europe.

== Reception ==
=== IBM's response ===
Though IBM has never directly denied any of the evidence posed by the book, it has criticized Black's research methods and accusatory conclusions. IBM claimed it does not have any other information about the company during its World War II period or the operations of Dehomag, as it argued most documents were destroyed or lost during the war. IBM also claimed that an earlier dismissed lawsuit, initiated by lawyers representing concentration camp survivors, was filed in 2001 to coincide with Black's book launch. Lawyers for the Holocaust victims acknowledged the timing of the lawsuit to coincide with Black's book release, explaining their public relations strategies played an important role in their record of achieving Nazi-era settlements totaling more than $7 billion without winning a judgment.

After the publication of Black's updated 2002 paperback edition, IBM responded by stating it wasn't convinced there were any new findings and there was no proof IBM had enabled the Holocaust. IBM rejected Black's assertion that IBM was hiding information and records regarding its World War II era. Several years previously, IBM had given its corporate records of the period to academic archives in New York and Stuttgart, Germany, for review by undefined "independent scholars". In early 2021, Black published the 20th anniversary edition with special public events and a syndicated article stating that in twenty years, "not a comma has been changed", adding that "IBM has never requested a correction or denied any facts in the book."

==== Wikipedia editing controversy ====
In 2010, Black reported on unidentified Wikipedia editors marginalizing his research on IBM's role in the Holocaust. It is not clear whether the editors involved were IBM employees, but Black states that, "[they were] openly fortified by official IBM corporate archivist Paul Lasewicz using his real name, and others"; Black nevertheless calls Lasewicz a "man of integrity" and points out that he deferred taking the lead because of potential conflict of interest and then recused himself entirely.

=== Critical response ===
The book was published on February 11, 2001, simultaneously in 40 countries in 14 languages, with numerous subsequent expanded editions, and hundreds of published reviews in many languages have appeared. At the first edition release in 2001, Newsweek called the book "explosive", adding, "backed by exhaustive research, Black's case is simple and stunning. ... Black clearly demonstrates that Nazi Germany employed IBM Hollerith punch-card machines to perform critical tasks in carrying out the Holocaust and the German war effort ... Black establishes beyond dispute that IBM Hollerith machines significantly advanced Nazi efforts to exterminate Jewry." In 2003, the American Society of Journalists and Authors acknowledged IBM and the Holocaust with its award for Best Non-Fiction Book of the Year.

Richard Bernstein, writing for The New York Times Book Review about the original 2001 first edition, said "Edwin Black makes a copiously documented case for the utter amorality of the profit motive and its indifference to consequences" but that Black's case "is long and heavily documented, and yet he does not demonstrate that IBM bears some unique or decisive responsibility for the evil that was done". In a 2001 review in the Los Angeles Times, historian and UCLA professor Saul Friedlander wrote, "The author convincingly shows the relentless efforts made by IBM to maximize profit by selling its machines and its punch cards to a country whose criminal record would soon be widely recognized. Indeed, Black demonstrates with great precision that the godlike owner of the corporation, Thomas Watson, was impervious to the moral dimension of his dealings with Hitler's Germany and for years even had a soft spot for the Nazi regime."

In another review of the first edition, David Cesarani of Southampton University stated that Black provided "shocking evidence" that IBM in America continued to provide punch cards and other services to the Nazis "in defiance of Allied regulations against trading with the enemy." In a 2001 review of the first edition in The Atlantic, Jack Beatty wrote, "This is a shocking book ... Edwin Black has documented a sordid relationship between this great American company and the Third Reich, one that extended into the war years." Robert Urekew's review in the Harvard International Review stated: "Black's meticulous documentation reveals an undeniable fact: after the outbreak of the World War II, the IBM corporation knew the whereabouts of each of its European-leased machines, and what revenues it could expect from them."

After the updated paperback edition in 2002, Oliver Burkeman wrote for The Guardian, "The paperback provides the first evidence that the company's dealings with the Nazis were controlled from its New York headquarters throughout the second world war." Sam Jaffe in Businessweek wrote: "With exhaustive research, Black makes the case that IBM and Watson conspired with Nazi Germany to help automate the genocide of Europe's Jews." Reuters reported in 2002 that historians on Black's research team stated the paperback edition had used newly discovered Nazi documents and Polish eyewitness testimony to link IBM's U.S. operations directly to the Third Reich operations in Poland. Several reviewers publicly retracted their negative reviews, with signed written apologies and donations to Holocaust museums, including reviewers in The Jerusalem Report, Nature Magazine, AudioFile magazine, Annals of the History of Computing, and the World Association of International Scholars.

== Related legal actions ==
In February 2001, an Alien Tort Claims Act claim was filed in U.S. federal court against IBM for allegedly providing the punched card technology that facilitated the Holocaust, and for covering up German IBM subsidiary Dehomag's activities. There was no evidence in the suit that IBM officials in New York explicitly ordered that technology be supplied to the Nazis with the understanding it would be used in concentration camps; however, lawyers representing victims of Nazi oppression claimed Dehomag's founder Heidinger expressed pride in giving Hitler data that could be used in "corrective interventions" and pledged to "follow his orders blindly". In April 2001, the lawsuit was dropped after lawyers feared the suit would slow down payments from a German Holocaust fund for Holocaust survivors who had suffered under Nazi persecution. IBM's German division had paid $3 million into the fund, while clearly avoiding admission of liability.

In 2004, the Roma human rights organization Gypsy International Recognition and Compensation Action (GIRCA) filed suit against IBM in Switzerland. However, the case was dismissed in 2006 under the relevant statute of limitations. The Electronic Frontier Foundation (EFF) said in a 2015 unrelated lawsuit filed in U.S. federal court against IBM: "We point out the disturbing parallels between IBM's actions vis-à-vis South Africa and Nazi Germany: IBM New York purposefully 'facilitated gross human rights abuses by the Third Reich'."

== See also ==
- Alfred P. Sloan
- Final Solution
- Henry Ford
- James D. Mooney
- Identification in Nazi camps
- List of international subsidiaries of IBM
