= Thomas J. Watson =

American businessman (1874–1956)

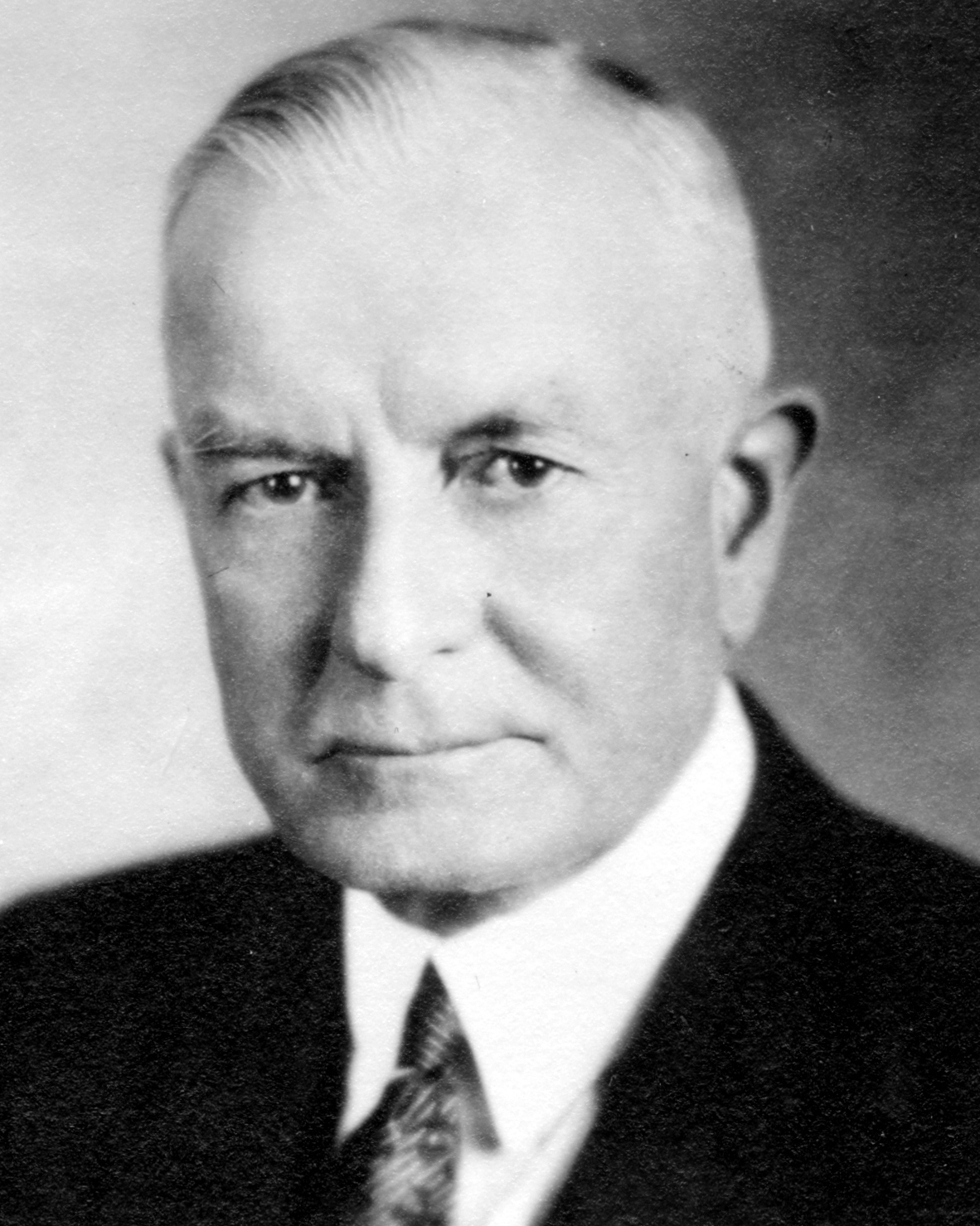
- Watson in 1920s
- Born: Thomas John Watson; February 17, 1874; Campbell, New York, U.S.
- Died: June 19, 1956 (aged 82); Manhattan, New York City, U.S.
- Occupations: Chairman and CEO of IBM 1914–1956
- Spouse: Jeanette M. Kittredge (m. 1913)
- Children: 4, including Thomas Watson Jr. and Arthur K. Watson

Thomas John Watson Sr. (February 17, 1874 – June 19, 1956) was an American businessman who was the chairman and CEO of IBM. He oversaw the company's growth into an international force from 1914 to 1956. Watson developed IBM's management style and corporate culture from John Henry Patterson's training at NCR. He turned the company into a highly effective selling organization, based largely on punched card tabulating machines.

Watson authorized providing Nazi Germany with data processing solutions and involved IBM in cooperation throughout the 1930s and until the end of World War II, profiting from both the German and American war efforts. A leading self-made industrialist, he was one of the richest men of his time when he died in 1956.

== Early life and career ==
Thomas J. Watson was born in Campbell, New York, in the state's Southern Tier region, the fifth child and only son of Thomas and Jane Fulton White Watson. His four older siblings were Jennie, Effie, Loua, and Emma. His father farmed and owned a modest lumber business located near Painted Post, a few miles west of Corning. Thomas worked on the family farm in East Campbell and attended the District School Number Five in the late 1870s. As Watson entered his teen years he attended Addison Academy in nearby Addison.

Having given up his first job—teaching—after just one day, Watson took a year's course in accounting and business at the Miller School of Commerce in Elmira, New York. He left the school in 1891, taking a job at $6 a week as bookkeeper for Clarence Risley's Market in Painted Post. One year later he joined a traveling salesman, George Cornwell, peddling organs and pianos around the farms for William Bronson's local hardware store. When Cornwell left, Watson continued alone, earning $10 per week. After two years of this life, he realized he would be earning $70 per week if he were on a commission. His indignation on making this discovery was such that he quit and moved from his familiar surroundings to the relative metropolis of Buffalo.

Watson then spent a very brief period selling sewing machines for Wheeler and Wilson. According to his son Thomas J. Watson Jr.'s autobiography:

One day my dad went into a roadside saloon to celebrate a sale and had too much to drink. When the bar closed, he found that his entire rig—horse, buggy, and samples—had been stolen. Wheeler and Wilson fired him and dunned him for the lost property. Word got around, of course, and it took Dad more than a year to find another steady job.

Watson would later enforce strict rules at IBM against alcohol consumption, even off the job. According to Tom Jr.:

This anecdote never made it into IBM lore, which is too bad, because it would have helped explain Father to the tens of thousands of people who had to follow his rules.

Watson's next job was peddling shares of the Buffalo Building and Loan Company for a huckster named C. B. Barron, a showman renowned for his disreputable conduct, which Watson deplored. Barron absconded with the commission and the loan funds. Next Watson opened a butcher shop in Buffalo, which soon failed, leaving Watson with no money, no investment, and no job.

== NCR ==
Watson had a newly acquired NCR cash register in his butcher shop, for which he had to arrange transfer of its installment payments to the shop's new owner. On visiting NCR he met its Buffalo branch manager, John J. Range, and asked him for a job. Determined to join the company, he repeatedly called on Range until, after a number of abortive attempts, he finally was hired in November 1896, as sales apprentice to Range.

Led by John Patterson, NCR was then one of the leading selling organizations, and Range became almost a father figure for Watson and was a model for his sales and management style. Under Range's guidance Watson became the most successful salesman in the East, earning $100 per week. In a 1952 interview Watson claimed he learned more from Range than anyone else. Four years later, NCR assigned Watson to run the struggling NCR agency in Rochester, New York. As an agent, he got 35% commission and reported directly to Hugh Chalmers, the second-in-command at NCR. In four years Watson made Rochester effectively an NCR monopoly by using the technique of knocking the main competitor, Hallwood, out of business, sometimes resorting to sabotage of the competitor's machines. As a reward, he was called to the NCR head office in Dayton, Ohio.

In 1912, the company was found guilty of violating the Sherman Antitrust Act. Patterson, Watson, and 26 other NCR executives and managers were convicted for illegal anti-competitive sales practices and were sentenced to one year of imprisonment. Their convictions were unpopular with the public because of the efforts of Patterson and Watson to help those affected by the Great Dayton Flood of 1913, but efforts to have them pardoned by President Woodrow Wilson were unsuccessful. However, their convictions were overturned on appeal in 1915 on the grounds that important defense evidence should have been admitted and the Justice Department declined to retry the criminal case and determined it would not further pursue the civil case.

== Head of IBM ==
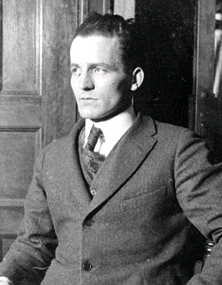
Watson in 1917

Charles Ranlett Flint, who had engineered the amalgamation (via stock acquisition) forming the Computing-Tabulating-Recording Company (CTR) found it difficult to manage the five companies. He hired Watson as general manager on May 1, 1914, when the five companies had about 1,300 employees. Eleven months later Watson was made President when court cases relating to his time at NCR were resolved. Within four years revenues had been doubled to $9 million. In 1924, he renamed CTR to International Business Machines. Watson built IBM into such a dominant company that the federal government filed a civil antitrust suit against it in 1952. IBM owned and leased to its customers more than 90 percent of all tabulating machines in the United States at the time. When Watson died in 1956, IBM's revenues were $897 million, and the company had 72,500 employees.

Throughout his life, Watson maintained a deep interest in international relations, from both a diplomatic and a business perspective. He was known as US President Franklin D. Roosevelt's unofficial ambassador in New York and often entertained foreign statesmen. In 1937, he was elected president of the International Chamber of Commerce (ICC) and at that year's biennial congress in Berlin stated that the conference keynote would be "World Peace Through World Trade." That phrase became the slogan of both the ICC and IBM.

=== Dealings with Nazi Germany ===
In 1937, as President of the International Chamber of Commerce, Watson met Adolf Hitler. During the 1930s, IBM's German subsidiary was its most profitable foreign operation. A 2001 book by Edwin Black, IBM and the Holocaust, claims that Watson's pursuit of profit led him to personally approve and spearhead IBM's strategic technological relationship with Nazi Germany. It describes how IBM provided the tabulating equipment Hitler used to round up the Jews. His Hollerith punch-card machines are in the Holocaust Museum today. The book describes IBM's punch cards as "a card with standardized holes", each representing a different trait of the individual. The card was fed into a "reader" and sorted. Punch cards identified Jews by name. Each one served as "a twentieth-century bar code for human beings". In particular, critics point to the Order of the German Eagle medal that Watson received at the Berlin ICC meeting in 1937, as evidence that he was being honored for the help that IBM's German subsidiary Dehomag (Deutsche Hollerith-Maschinen Gesellschaft mbH) and its punch card machines provided the Nazi regime, particularly in the tabulation of census data (which included the location of Jews). Another study argues that Watson believed, perhaps naively, that the medal was in recognition of his years of labor on behalf of global commerce and international peace.^{[please add a precise citation page]}

Because of his strong feelings about the issue, Watson wanted to return his German citation shortly after receiving it. When Secretary of State Hull advised him against that course of action, he gave up the idea until the spring of 1940. Then Hull refused advice, and Watson sent the medal back in June 1940. Dehomag's management disapproved of Watson's action and considered separating from IBM. This occurred when Germany declared war on the United States in December 1941, and the German shareholders took custody of the Dehomag operation. However, during World War II, IBM subsidiaries in occupied Europe never stopped delivery of punch cards to Dehomag, and documents uncovered show that senior executives at IBM world headquarters in New York took great pains to maintain legal authority over Dehomag's operations and assets through the personal intervention of IBM managers in neutral Switzerland, directed via personal communications and private letters, which confirms the close ties between the company’s headquarters and its subsidiaries throughout the war.

=== Dealings with the United States ===
During this same period, IBM became more deeply involved in the war effort for the U.S., focusing on producing large quantities of data processing equipment for the military and experimenting with analog computers. Watson Sr. also developed the "1% doctrine" for war profits which mandated that IBM receive no more than 1% profit from the sales of military equipment to U.S. Government. Watson was one of the few CEOs to develop such a policy.

In 1941, Watson received the third highest salary and compensation package in the U.S., $517,221, on which he paid 69% in tax.

Watson had a personal interest in the progress of the war. His eldest son, Thomas J. Watson Jr., joined the United States Army Air Corps and became a bomber pilot. He was soon hand-picked to become the assistant and personal pilot for General Follet Bradley, who was in charge of all Lend-Lease equipment supplied to the Soviet Union from the United States. Watson Sr.'s youngest son, Arthur K. Watson, also joined the military during the conflict.

=== Post–World War II ===
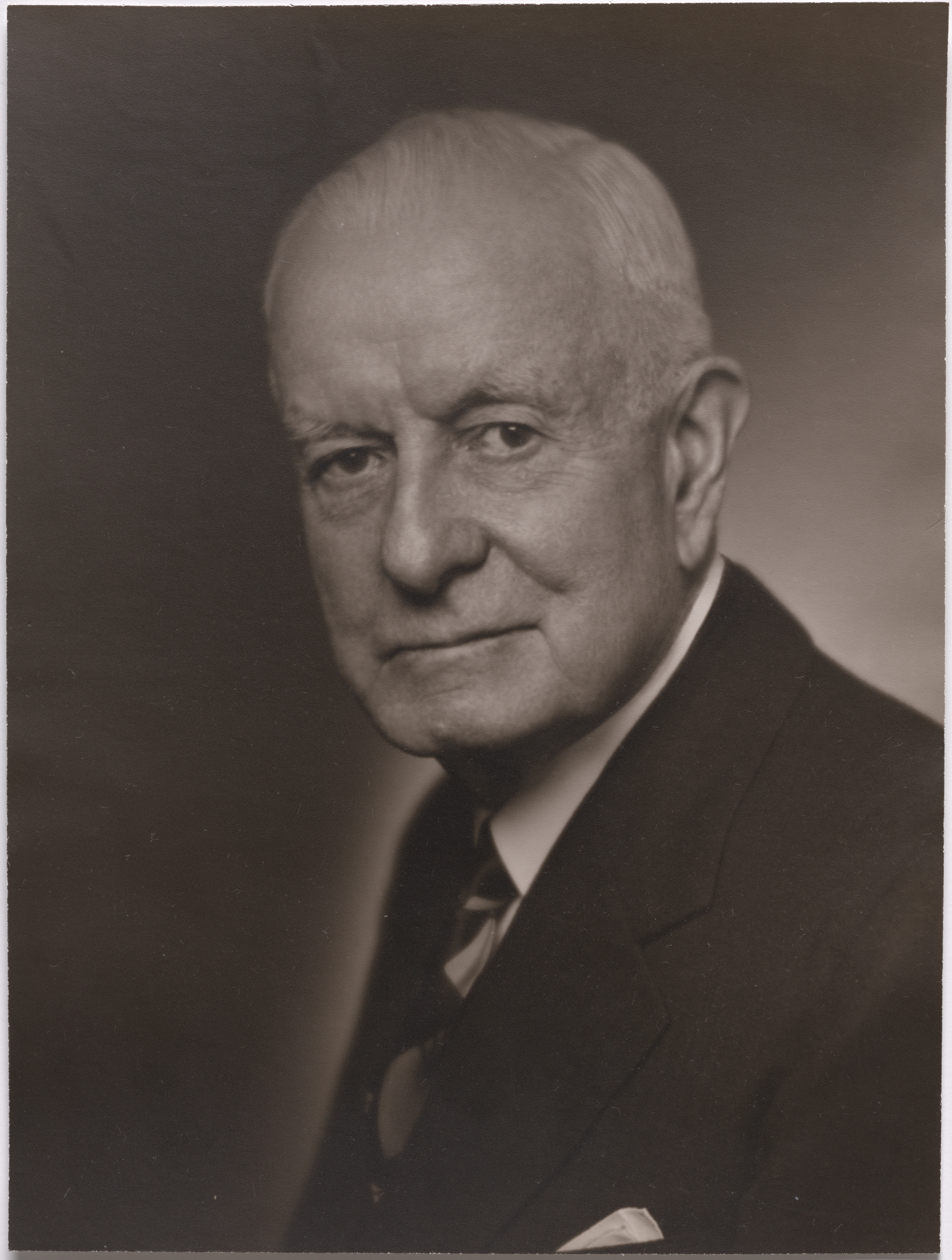
Watson in 1950

Watson worked with local leaders to create a college in the Binghamton area, where IBM was founded and had major plants. In 1946, IBM provided land and funding for Triple Cities College, an extension of Syracuse University. Later it became known as Harpur College, and eventually evolved into Binghamton University.

After World War II, Watson began work to further the extent of IBM's influence abroad and in 1949, he created the IBM World Trade Corporation in order to oversee IBM's foreign business.

Watson retired in May 1956 and his oldest son, Thomas J. Watson Jr., became IBM's CEO. Watson Sr. died on June 19, 1956, in Manhattan, New York City, and was buried in Sleepy Hollow Cemetery in Sleepy Hollow, New York.

== Personal life ==
Watson married Jeanette Kittredge, from a prominent Dayton, Ohio, railroad family, on April 17, 1913. They had two sons and two daughters.

1. Thomas Watson Jr. succeeded his father as IBM chairman and later served as ambassador to the Soviet Union under Jimmy Carter
2. Jeanette Watson Irwin married businessman John N. Irwin II, later ambassador to France
3. Helen Watson Buckner became an important philanthropist in New York City
4. Arthur K. Watson served as president of IBM World Trade Corporation and later, as ambassador to France

As a Democrat (after his criminal indictment by the Taft Administration), Watson was an ardent supporter of Roosevelt. He was one of the most prominent businessmen in the Democratic Party. He was considered Roosevelt's strongest supporter in the business community.

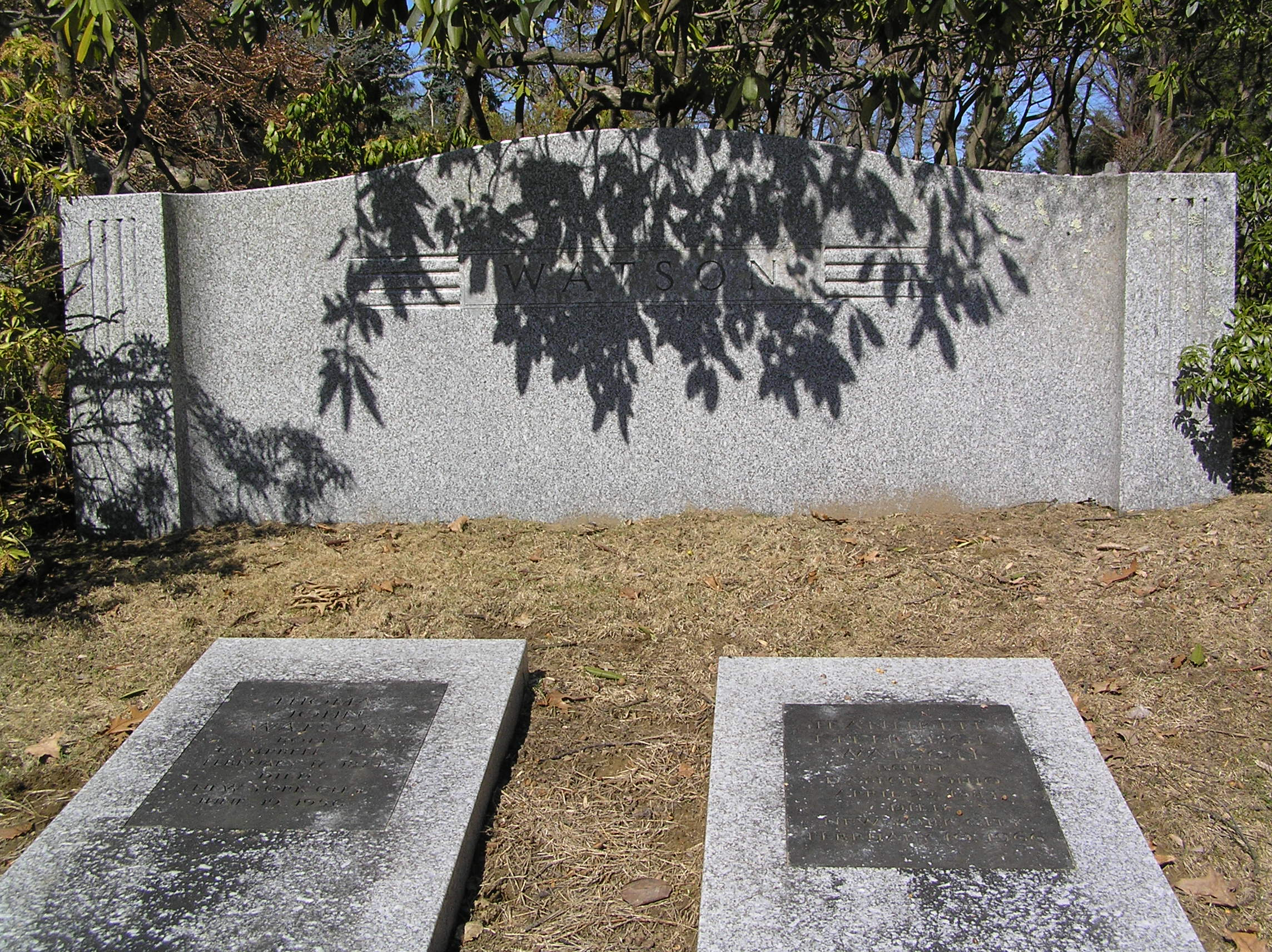
The gravesite of Thomas J. Watson Sr.

Watson served as a powerful trustee of Columbia University from June 6, 1933, until his death. He engineered the selection of Dwight D. Eisenhower as its president and played the central role in convincing Eisenhower to become president of the university. Additionally, he served as a trustee of Lafayette College and is the namesake of Watson Hall, a campus residence hall.

In 1936 the U.S. Supreme Court upheld a lower court decision that IBM, together with Remington Rand, should cease its practice of requiring its customers to buy their punch cards from it alone. The ruling made little difference because IBM was the only effective supplier to the market, and profits continued undiminished.

In 1937, Watson was awarded the Order of the German Eagle by Adolf Hitler. Watson was also president of the International Chamber of Commerce in 1937; the medal was awarded while the ICC was meeting in Germany that year.

In 1939, he received an honorary degree in Doctor of Commercial Science from Oglethorpe University.

In the 1940s, Watson was on the national executive board of the Boy Scouts of America and served for a time as an international Scout commissioner. E. Urner Goodman recounts that the elderly Watson attended an international Scout commissioners' meeting in Switzerland, where the IBM founder asked not to be put on a pedestal. Before the conference was over, Goodman relates, Watson "... sat by that campfire, in Scout uniform, 'chewing the fat' like the rest of the boys". He received the Silver Buffalo Award in 1944. His son, Thomas Jr., later served as national president of the Boy Scouts from 1964 to 1968. He was also inducted into the Steuben County, New York Hall of Fame. Throughout his life Watson continued to own and enjoy the family farm on which he was born. In 1955 he and his wife gave it, along with one million dollars, to the Methodist Church for use as a retreat and conference center, to be named Watson Homestead in memory of his parents. Watson Homestead became independent of the church in 1995, and continues as a conference and retreat center. The one-room school that Watson attended as a child is still on the grounds.

Watson was chairman of the Elmira College centennial committee in 1955 and donated Watson Hall, primarily a music and mathematics academic building.

Watson was a member of both the American Academy of Arts and Sciences (1960) and the American Philosophical Society (1984). For the last 16 years of his life, he was an elder of the Brick Presbyterian Church in New York City.

The Thomas J. Watson Sr. Center For Information Technology at Brown University is named after him.

He was posthumously inducted into the Junior Achievement U.S. Business Hall of Fame in 1990.

== Famous attribution ==
Although Watson is well known for his alleged 1943 statement, "I think there is a world market for maybe five computers," there is scant evidence he said it. Author Kevin Maney tried to find the origin of the quote, but has been unable to locate any speeches or documents of Watson's that contain this, nor are the words present in any contemporary articles about IBM.

One of the first attributions is in the German magazine Der Spiegel of May 22, 1965, stating that IBM boss Thomas Watson had not been interested in the new machines initially, and when the first commercial calculation behemoths appeared in the early 1950s, filling whole floors with thousands of heat generating vacuum tubes, he estimated the demand by the US economy at a maximum of five.

Later attributions may be found in The Experts Speak, a book written by Christopher Cerf and Victor S. Navasky in 1984. Cerf and Navasky quote from a book written by Morgan and Langford, Facts and Fallacies. Another early article source (May 15, 1985) is a column by Neil Morgan, a San Diego Evening Tribune writer who wrote: "Forrest Shumway, chairman of The Signal Cos., doesn't make predictions. His role model is Tom Watson, then IBM chairman, who said in 1958: 'I think there is a world market for about five computers.'" The earliest known citation on the Internet is from 1986 on Usenet in the signature of a poster from Convex Computer Corporation as "'I think there is a world market for about five computers' —Remark attributed to Thomas J. Watson (Chairman of the Board of International Business Machines), 1943". All these early quotes are questioned by Eric Weiss, an editor of the Annals of the History of Computing in ACS letters in 1985.

There are documented versions of similar quotes by other people in the early history of the computer. In 1946 Sir Charles Darwin (grandson of the famous naturalist), head of Britain's NPL (National Physical Laboratory), where research into computers was taking place, wrote:

it is very possible that ... one machine would suffice to solve all the problems that are demanded of it from the whole country.

In 1985 the story was discussed on Usenet (in net.misc), without Watson's name being attached. The original discussion has not survived, but an explanation has; it attributes a very similar quote to the Cambridge mathematician Professor Douglas Hartree, around 1951:

I went to see Professor Douglas Hartree, who had built the first differential analyzers in England and had more experience in using these very specialized computers than anyone else. He told me that, in his opinion, all the calculations that would ever be needed in this country could be done on the three digital computers which were then being built—one in Cambridge, one in Teddington, and one in Manchester. No one else, he said, would ever need machines of their own, or would be able to afford to buy them.

Howard H. Aiken made a similar statement in 1952:

Originally one thought that if there were a half dozen large computers in this country, hidden away in research laboratories, this would take care of all requirements we had throughout the country.

The story already had been described as a myth in 1973; the Economist quoted a Mr. Maney as "revealing that Watson never made his oft-quoted prediction that there was 'a world market for maybe five computers.'"

Since the attribution typically is used to demonstrate the fallacy of predictions, if Watson had made such a prediction in 1943, then, as Gordon Bell pointed out in his ACM 50 years celebration keynote, it would have held true for some ten years.

The IBM archives of Frequently Asked Questions notes an inquiry about whether he said in the 1950s that he foresaw a market potential for only five electronic computers. The document says no, but quotes his son and then IBM President Thomas J. Watson Jr. at the annual IBM stockholders meeting, April 28, 1953, as speaking about the IBM 701 Electronic Data Processing Machine, which it identifies as "the company's first production computer designed for scientific calculations". He said that "IBM had developed a paper plan for such a machine and took this paper plan across the country to some 20 concerns that we thought could use such a machine. I would like to tell you that the machine rents for between $12,000 and $18,000 a month, so it was not the type of thing that could be sold from place to place. But, as a result of our trip, on which we expected to get orders for five machines, we came home with orders for 18." Watson Jr. later gave a slightly different version of the story in his autobiography, where he said the initial market sampling indicated 11 firm takers and 10 more prospective orders.

== Famous motto ==
"THINK" – Watson began using "THINK" to motivate, or inspire, staff while at NCR and continued to use it at CTR. International Business Machines's first U.S. trademark was for the name "THINK" filed as a U.S. trademark on June 6, 1935, with the description "periodical publications". This trademark was filed fourteen years before the company filed for a U.S. trademark on the name IBM. A biographical article in 1940 noted that "This word is on the most conspicuous wall of every room in every IBM building. Each employee carries a THINK notebook in which to record inspirations. The company stationery, matches, scratch pads all bear the inscription, THINK. A monthly magazine called 'Think' is distributed to the employees." THINK remains a part of IBM's corporate culture; it was the inspiration behind naming IBM's successful line of notebook computers, IBM ThinkPad. In 2007, IBM Mid America Employees Federal Credit Union changed its name to Think Mutual Bank.

== See also ==
- IBM and the Holocaust
- IBM and World War II
- Jeannette K. Watson Fellowship
- Thomas J. Watson Fellowship
- Thomas J. Watson Research Center
- Thomas J. Watson College of Engineering and Applied Science
- Watson (computer), named in honor of Thomas J. Watson

Business positions
Preceded by None	CEO of IBM; 1914–1956	Succeeded by Thomas Watson Jr.
