= Never Again pledge =

Anti-discrimination promise and group

- Website: neveragain.tech
- Users: 2833 (as of 25 December 2016)
- Launched: 13 December 2016; 9 years ago

The Never Again pledge or NeverAgain.tech is a commitment by information technology workers to work against a United States government database identifying people by race, religion, or national origin, specifically in response to the Trump presidential campaign statements about creating a Muslim registry and deporting millions of illegal immigrants.

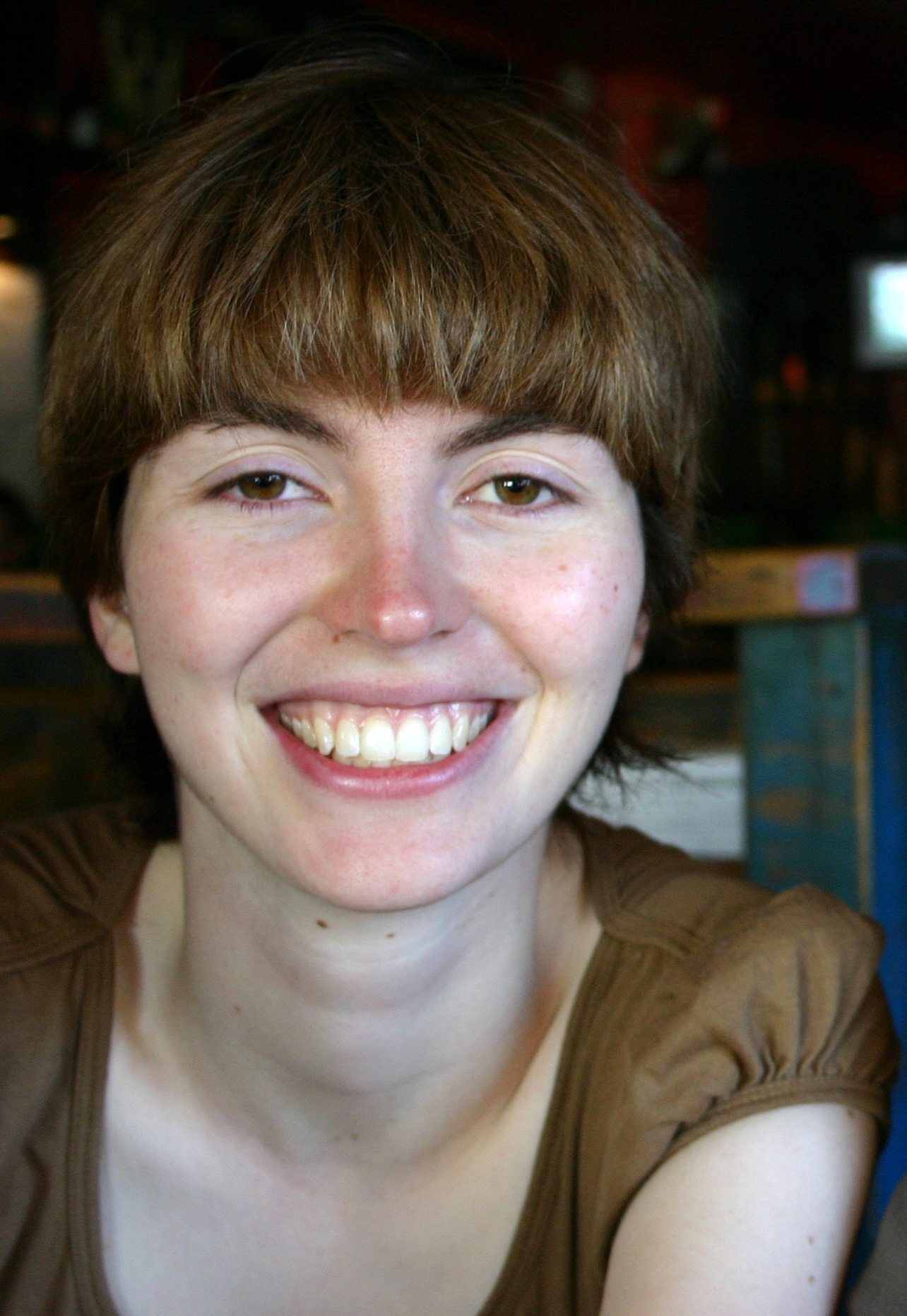
Leigh Honeywell in 2006

The pledge was placed online on December 13, 2016 and had gathered more than 1,300 technology worker signatures two days later, including employees of Amazon.com, Apple Inc., Google, and Microsoft. The online release was intended to anticipate the meeting of Silicon Valley executives with Trump on December 14. The pledge grew out of a Bay Area Tech Solidarity meeting held by Maciej Ceglowski; the lead organizer of the pledge was Leigh Honeywell, with co-organizers Ka-Ping Yee and Valerie Aurora. The name of the pledge, "never again", refers to the historical use of IBM information technology in World War II to enable the internment of Japanese Americans in the United States and the Holocaust and use of Nazi concentration camps in Germany.

Computerworld magazine wrote, and Aurora admitted, that the action of publicly signing the pledge could put tech workers at risk of losing their jobs, especially those with security clearances. Inc. magazine wrote that before the Never Again pledge, only Twitter had stated that it would oppose a Muslim registry, but after the pledge, the list of such American technology companies grew to include Apple Inc., Facebook, Google, IBM, Lyft, Medium, Microsoft, Salesforce.com and Uber. (Inc. maintains A Running List of Tech Companies That Have Pledged Not to Build a Muslim Registry.)
