= Béatrice Pesquet-Popescu =

French engineer

Béatrice Pesquet-Popescu is a Romanian electrical engineer who works in France at Telecom ParisTech. After earning an engineering degree in 1995 from the Politehnica University of Bucharest, she completed a Ph.D. at the École Normale Supérieure de Cachan in Paris in 1998. After working as a research scientist for Philips Research, she joined Telecom ParisTech in 2000.

She was named a Fellow of the Institute of Electrical and Electronics Engineers (IEEE) in 2013 "for her contributions to image and video compression and networking".
