= Nenitzescu indole synthesis =

Chemical reaction

Named after	Costin Nenițescu
Reaction type	Ring forming reaction

The Nenitzescu indole synthesis is a chemical reaction that forms 5-hydroxyindole derivatives from benzoquinone and β-aminocrotonic esters.

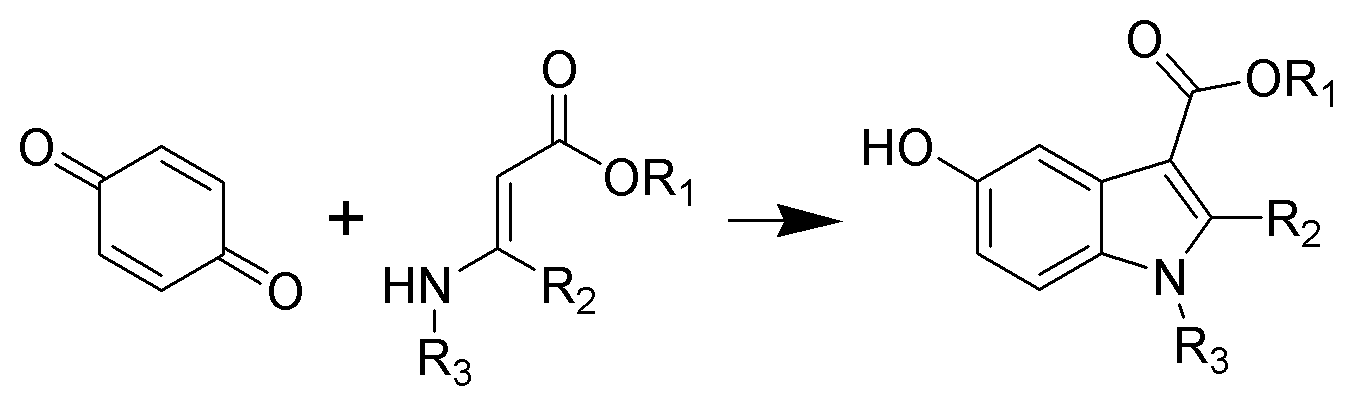
The Nenitzescu indole synthesis

This reaction was named for its discoverer, Costin Nenițescu, who first reported it in 1929. It can be performed with a number of different combinations of R-groups, which include methyl, methoxy, ethyl, propyl, and H substituents. There is also a solid-state variation in which the reaction takes place on a highly cross-linked polymer scaffold. The synthesis is particularly interesting because indoles are the foundation for a number of biochemically important molecules, including neurotransmitters and a new class of antitumor compounds.

== Mechanism ==
The mechanism of a Nenitzescu reaction consists of a Michael addition, followed by a nucleophilic attack by the enamine pi bond, and then an elimination.

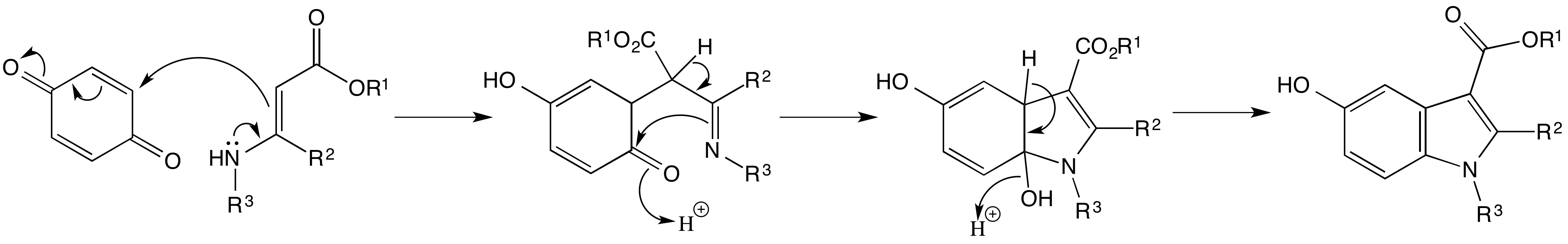
Mechanism for the Nenitzescu indole synthesis

The reaction was first published by Nenitzescu in 1929, and has since been refined by Allen et al. In his 1996 publication, Allen and coworkers investigated the effects that different substituents on the benzoquinone starting material had on the arrangement of the final product. These steric effects also gave evidence that one of the two current proposed mechanisms was more likely than the other, which led to the publication of the mechanism shown above.

== Conditions ==
A preliminary study conducted by Katkevica et al. investigated the reaction conditions for a Nenitzescu synthesis, and reported on the behavior of the reaction when it takes place in various solvents. Their results indicated that the reaction performs best in a highly polar solvent, and further kinetic studies involving variation of the substrate, reagents, solvents, and the presence of Lewis acids and bases were proposed. Two years later, Velezheva et al. went on to report an alternative version of the synthesis using a Lewis acid catalyst. They report that the catalyzing effect originates from enamine activation through a diketodienamine-ZnCl_{2} complex.

However, despite improvements in the conditions, the traditional Nenitzescu synthesis was not suitable for use on a manufacturing scale because of a relatively low yield and polymerization under normal reaction conditions. Originally, it was believed that the benzoquinone had to be used in 100% excess to drive the reaction to completion on this scale, but Huang et al. reported that a 20–60% excess is most effective. Furthermore, they reported that for the ideal conditions for a large-scale reaction, there should be a 1:1.2-1.6 mole ratio between the benzoquinone and the ethyl 3-aminocrotonate, and the reaction should take place around room temperature. These conditions are sufficient for producing batches of 100 kg or more.

== Variations and related reactions ==
One of the most common variations of the Nenitzescu reaction is the solid phase variant. This reaction, first reported by Ketcha et al., is shown below.

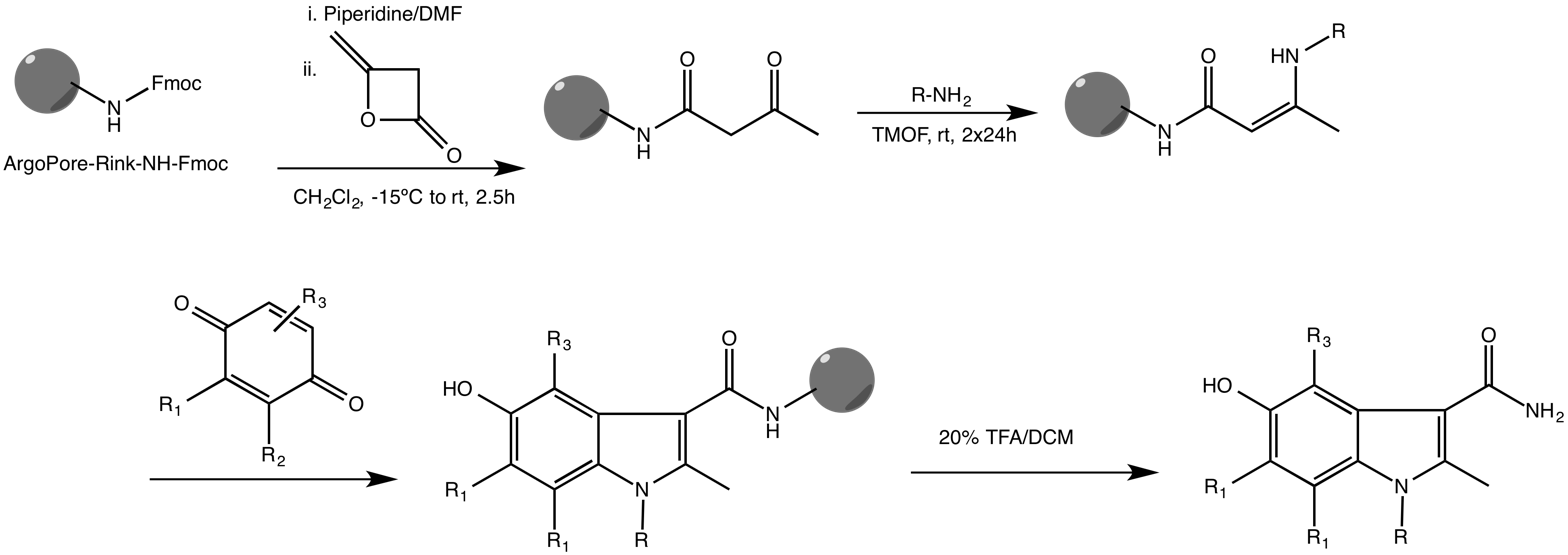
Description of the solid-phase Nenitzescu indole synthesis

It takes place on a highly cross-linked ArgoPore®-Rink-NH-Fmoc resin and functions with a variety of substituents on both reactants. Other solid-phase indole syntheses were also reported, some of which use different scaffolds and metal catalysts to drive the reaction to completion.

There are also a variety of other reactions that result in the same indole skeleton. In a review article, Taber et al. categorize these reactions into nine basic types of indole syntheses: Fischer, Mori, Hemetsberger, Buchwald, Sundberg, Madelung, Nenitzescu, van Leusen and Kanematsu.

== Applications ==
The 5-hydroxyindole skeleton is the foundation for a number of biochemically important molecules. Among them are serotonin, a neurotransmitter; indometacin, a non-steroidal anti-inflammatory agent; L-761,066, a COX-2 inhibitor; and LY311727, an inhibitor of secretory phospholipase. Currently, one of the most interesting applications of the Nenitzescu synthesis is its ability to produce a precursor to antitumor compounds. This synthesis, reported in 2006, involves the reaction of 1,4,9,10-anthradiquinone with various enamines. The products of this reaction constitute a new class of lead structures for anticancer drug design.
