= Radu Manicatide =

Radu Manicatide (April 17, 1912 – March 18, 2004) was a Romanian engineer and aircraft constructor.

He was born in Iași and grew up in Bucharest, in a house on Luterană Street. In 1926, at age 14, Manicatide built his first plane (the RM-1, a single-seat glider) in his backyard, and flew with it on the street for a few meters. This was followed in 1927 by the RM-2 glider, which he tested at Sinaia. He obtained a pilot license in 1930. From 1931 to 1937 he earned an engineering degree from the University Politehnica of Bucharest, and then pursued his studies at École supérieure des techniques aéronautiques et de construction automobile (ESTACA), in Paris.

In 1932 he constructed his first plane, the RM-4, with a weight of 250 kg (550 lb) and a maximum speed of 85 km/h (53 mph). This was followed in 1935 by the RM-5 plane, with a maximum speed of 120 km/h (75 mph) and the RM-7 plane, with a maximum speed of 135 km/h (84 mph).

In 1939, he started working at Industria Aeronautică Română (IAR), in Brașov. There, he contributed to the design of the IAR 27, IAR-37, and IAR-80 aircraft, and in the production under license of the IAR 79 (with Savoia-Marchetti, Italy) and Bf 109 (with Messerschmitt, Germany) fighter aircraft.

Manicatide also directed the development of IAR-813, IAR-818H, and IAR 823 airplanes. In 1945, he designed the M.R. car.

In 2002, he was awarded by President Ion Iliescu the Order of the Star of Romania, Knight class. He died in Bucharest in 2004 and was buried in the city's Bellu Cemetery.
