= René Carmille =

French civil servant

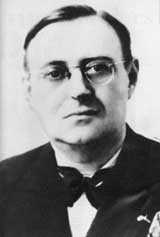
- Born: 8 January 1886; Trémolat, Dordogne, France
- Died: 25 January 1945 (aged 59); Dachau concentration camp, Bavaria, Nazi Germany
- Occupations: Computer expert (Analog & Electromechanical) and comptroller general of the French Army

René Carmille (8 January 1886 – 25 January 1945) was a French military officer, civil servant under the Republic and Vichy government, and member of the French Resistance. During World War II, in his office at the government's Demographics Department, he created the National Statistics Service and the individual code number which would become the social security number after liberation and is still used in France today. While there, Carmille sabotaged the Nazi census of France, thus saving tens of thousands of Jewish people from death camps.

== Pioneer of punched cards for registration ==
René Carmille served in the French Army in the First World War, initially as a battery commander and later in the Second Office (i.e. the espionage service). In April 1924, he was appointed the Comptroller of the army. As well as supervising several espionage operations, he became a specialist in industrial management, notably promoting the development of punch cards and electromechanical card readers in France.

As a senior civil servant in the 1930s, he proposed a 12-digit registration number based on the date and place of birth. This was intended to be assigned to boys as soon as they were registered with the civil registry, in part to support the anticipated war effort. He visited IBM's German subsidiary Dehomag in Berlin and brought back a sample of their 80-column punched card. In France, he supported the work of Bull, a pioneering supplier of punched card machines. He demonstrated the value of identifying individuals with what become the social security number but also the value of codes for geographical areas, economic activities and professions.

== Clandestine mobilization ==
After the outbreak of World War II, Carmille and Colonel du Vigier proposed the creation of central records of French civilians. As most of France was under German occupation, this was presented as a purely civil matter, but secretly the plan was to use the data to rapidly mobilize an army when required. This included records of demobilised soldiers as well as a census of the entire working-age population, to identify occupations, trades and qualifications.

As the collection grew, Carmille realised the value of a registration number as it was less ambiguous than recording the first and family names, as well as requiring fewer characters to record. As this was officially a civilian operation, births of girls as well as boys were recorded, by adding a thirteenth digit to the initial registration number: 1 for men, 2 for women.

In January 1941 a contract worth 36 million francs was signed between Bull and the Ministry of Finance to create an administrative statistical information system. In the same year, Bull was convicted of infringing IBM patents for having adopted the 80-column punched card. The appeal was suspended but eventually judged in favour of Bull in 1947. IBM lost the case because they were found to have issued 80-column punch card equipment before the patent was filed in France.

The Minister of Justice, Joseph Barthélémy (appointed 27 January 1941) wanted to distinguish Jewish citizens from the other inhabitants. Carmille argued that the civil status of the project did not allow this to be done so only the individual's sex was recorded in the first column.

A full national census was due to take place in 1941 but Carmille replaced this with a "census of professional activities". This census included a question (number 11): "Are you of Jewish race?", with reference to the "Statute of the Jews" promulgated on 3 October 1940. Question 11 of the census was only used to exclude or exempt Jewish people from the "Chantiers de Jeunesse" or youth camps organised by the Vichy government as quasi-military training camps. The census took place on 17 July 1941. A record had to be drawn up for each French or foreign person aged from 13 to 64 years old. Neither the number of responses nor the results of this census have ever been published.

Lieutenants Colonel Henri Zeller and Georges Pfister instructed Carmille to prepare for the clandestine remobilization of the French Army. During the winter of 1941-42, Carmille identified the names of 220,000 trained veterans living in the free zone, controlled by the Vichy government, and grouped them by locality and by unit. In this way, a partial mobilization on a regional basis would be possible. He also prepared punched cards that could print mobilization orders in a matter of hours.

However, in November 1942, German troops moved to occupy the southern zone of France. The French fleet was scuttled at Toulon on the 27th and the Vichy government dissolved its armistice army. General Verneau, head of the Army General Staff, gave orders "to destroy the documents relating to the clandestine mobilization." In December, Carmille decided to hide his work related to the clandestine mobilization. The codes and the files were hidden in a Jesuit seminary in Mongré, near Villefranche-sur-Saône in eastern France. He continued to develop the civil services statistical tools including further surveys and polls.

== Statistics and discrimination ==
The statistical service under Carmille was ordered to use its registration number scheme to assist the identification of Jewish people in France. Carmille did not explicitly refuse to obey, but instead worked as slowly and obstructively as possible. He gave oral instructions to colleagues to delay responses, leading to a kind of "work to rule". This was made easier as many of the people concerned were born abroad or in the annexed Alsace region and therefore had never been assigned an identity number. This passive disobedience was so effective that the "Digital report on the number of French and foreign Jews counted in June 1941" had still not been completed by the time of his arrest in February 1944. However, the police did not need Carmille's files. They organized raids and deportations from their own manual files.

Carmille has been described as being an early ethical hacker: "Over the course of two years, Carmille and his group purposely delayed the process by mishandling the punch cards. He also hacked his own machines, reprogramming them so that they’d never punch information from Column 11 [where citizens were asked to indicate their religion] onto any census card."

== Resistance, arrest and deportation ==
Carmille was a member of the resistance network of Pierre Sonneville, known as "Marco Polo". Throughout 1943 he coordinated his actions with Algiers and London. On 4 September 1943, on Carmille's instructions, André Caffot, helped by the resistance, flew from Reims to London to give the Intelligence Service a sample of the identity card that the Vichy government had recently created, as well as one of the machines intended to punch cards.

At the same time, death notices received at the statistical service were used by Carmille to make "real" identity cards with false identities, which were then made available to resistance fighters, German deserters and Jews. This enabled many to escape Nazi capture.

On 3 February 1944 René Carmille was arrested in Lyon along with his chief of staff Raymond Jaouen. Described by the Germans as "the great enemy of the German army, having maintained relations with London and aiding terrorist groups", he was taken to the Hotel Terminus where he was interrogated by Klaus Barbie, who tortured him for two days. He was sent to the Montluc prison, then Barbie had both prisoners transferred to Compiègne in northern France. From there they left for Dachau by the "death train" of 2-5 July 1944, one of the last convoys of deportees. Jaouen died of suffocation during the journey and Carmille died of typhus on 25 January 1945 at Dachau.

== In popular culture ==
A short animated documentary was released about Carmille in 2010 called Interregnum which stars Nicole Stamp.
