= IAR 823 =

Type of aircraft

IAR-823
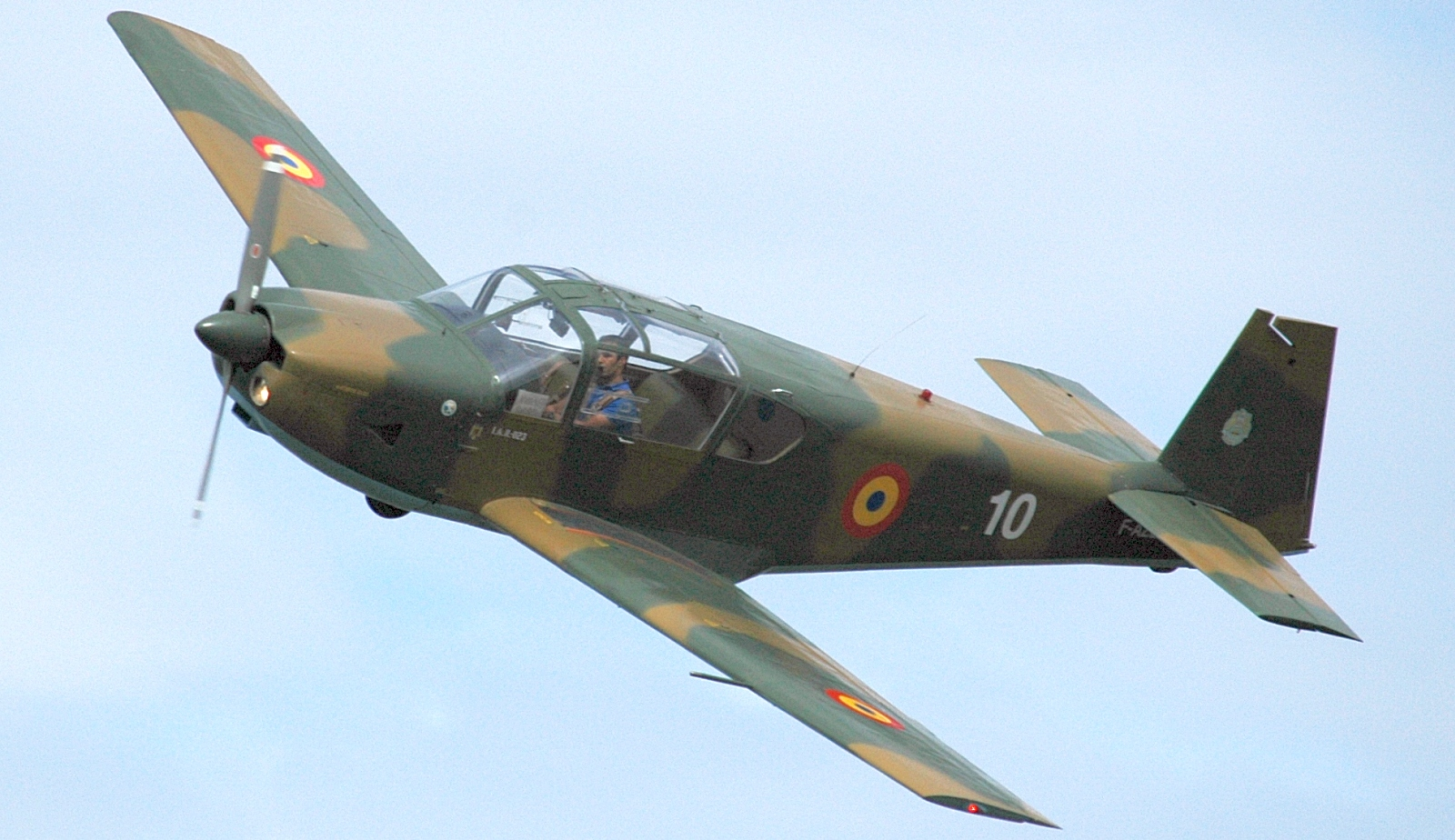
- IAR 823 F-AZLQ in Romanian Air Force markings at a French airshow

General information
- Type: Civil and military trainer
- National origin: Romania
- Manufacturer: IAR
- Designer: Radu Manicatide
- Primary users: Romanian Air Force Angolan Air Force; Romanian Air Club; Hungarian Air Club
- Number built: 80

History
- Introduction date: 1974
- First flight: 10 June 1973

The IAR-823 is a civil and military trainer aircraft built in Romania from 1974 until 1983. It is a conventional low-wing monoplane with retractable tricycle undercarriage. The pilot and instructor sit side-by-side, and two more seats can be fitted behind them. The type was adopted by the Romanian Air Force as a primary trainer, and was also supplied to Romanian and Hungarian aeroclubs and the national flying school of Angola.

== Development ==
IAR-823 was designed in 1970 by a team at IMFCA Bucharest (Institutul de Mecanica Fluidelor si Cercetari Aerospatiale – Institute of Fluid Mechanics and Aerospace Research) led by Radu Manicatide. The prototype's construction began in Autumn 1971 at ICA Brasov (now IAR Brasov). This plane, serialled 01, flew for the first time on 10 June 1973. The second plane built participated at the Farnborough Air Show in September 1974, registered YR-MEA.

It is a conventional low-wing monoplane with retractable tricycle undercarriage. Usually a crew of 2 – student and instructor seated side by side. Three more seats are available in the back, bringing the maximum to 5 people, including the pilot(s). This configuration can be replaced by one pilot, a stretcher for one wounded and a paramedic, or one pilot with 500 kg of freight.

The last aircraft produced for the Romanian Air Club, registered YR-MEL, was displayed at Le Bourget 1985, together with IAR-831 Pelican registered YR-IGA, a development of the IAR-823, which featured tandem seat arrangement. A more distant relative was the IAR-825TP Triumph (YR-IGB) – based on the Pelican, but with a turboprop engine. Although not envisioned to be used in combat, the aircraft has 2 underwing hardpoints, stressed for 100 kg each. Total maximum allowed weight of external stores is 200 kg

In total 78 planes were produced, with the last built in 1983. The first deliveries took place in 1974. The main customer was the Romanian Air Force, which needed to replace the IAR-813 in the basic flight training role.

== Operational history ==
Initially they were assigned to the 20th Regiment at Boboc, subsequently some were transferred to the 19th Regiment on the grass airfield at Focsani. Small numbers of aircraft were delivered to the Romanian Air Club, being operated at Brasov, Clinceni, Pitesti, Deva and other airfields.

12 IAR-823s were ordered by Angola in 1980. These aircraft were deployed to Negage in 1981. There, the Romanians put the bases of the 188th ENAM (national military aviation school), also having at their disposal 6 IAR-316B Alouette III and 6 BN-2A Islander, all manufactured in Romania. Flight training began already on 18 May 1981, with the first solo sortie of an Angolan trainee taking place on 30 July 1981 on board the IAR-823. Although both the Alouettes and the 823s could be lightly armed, no combat missions were flown, only training ones. A fatal crash occurred on 6 July 1981, when lt-cdr. Gheorghe Preda and Angolan student Ruy Nelson died on board an IAR-823. In 1983, the contract for the deployment of Romanian instructors was cancelled. The Romanians returned home while the remaining IAR-823 – plus the other aircraft – were handed over to the Angolan Air Force.

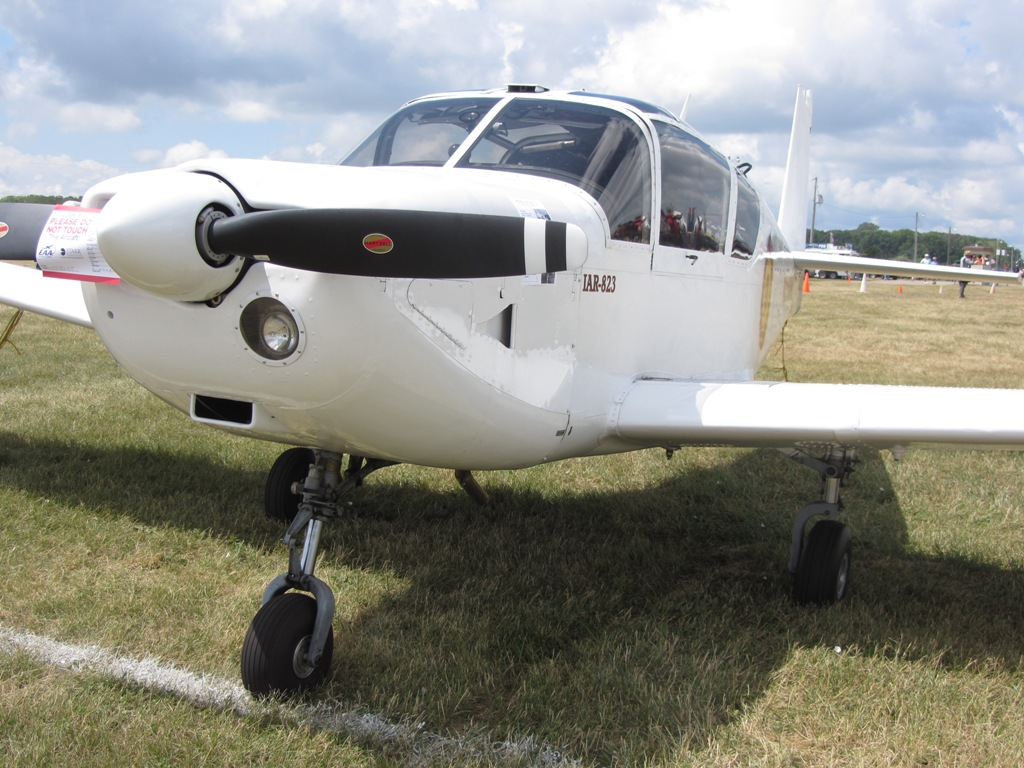
An IAR 823

In service with the Romanian Air Force there were four crashes, including the one in Angola, all fatal. Operations with the IAR-823 became a problem in the early 1990s: the fuel required for the type was no longer produced in country and had to be imported from Greece, at a time when budget problems plagued the Air Force. Besides, starting from the mid-1980s the much cheaper to operate Yak-52 started entering service. By the mid-1990s it had completely taken over the role of the IAR. There is no official date for the IAR-823's retirement from service, but it seems that it was grounded in the 1995–96 timeframe. All the surviving airframes were put in storage at Brasov.

Surplus to requirements and in need of a serious overhaul, they were put up for sale. 10 were bought by a private US customer in 1999, followed by another 36, plus all remaining spare parts in 2000. Another 6 were purchased in October 2004 from the Romanian Air Club, The overwhelming majority of these were restored back to flying condition.

== Variants ==
Theoretically, there are no versions of the IAR-823, all planes being built to the same specifications. Some of the aircraft were manufactured without hard points.

Production changes included a transition from a tubular canopy to an all fiberglass canopy, a transition from a three piece instrument panel to a single piece slide out instrument panel.

== Operators ==
=== Civil ===
Canada

- International Test Pilots School – 1 Aircraft operated at the London International Airport, Ontario Canada.
  - C-FPIU

Hungary

- Hungarian Aeronautical Association – 4 aircraft operated at the Budaörs Airport. Purchased from the USA.
  - HA-JDL, c/n 41
  - HA-JDM, c/n 42
  - HA-JDN, c/n 44
  - HA-VEZ, c/n 44

Romania

- Aeroclubul României – 10 aircraft registered in the YR-MEC to YR-MEL range. 6 were sold to private owners in the USA. One aircraft (YR-IAR) restored to flying condition.

United States

- Private Ownership – 35 aircraft registered, most of which are from Romanian Air Force stock
  - Blue Air Training : 5 aircraft

=== Military ===
Angola

- Angolan Air Force – 12 aircraft (c/n range between 56 and 67) delivered in 1981 to the ENAM flight school at Negoge.

Romania

- Romanian Air Force – 56 aircraft, c/n 01 to 57, were operated until the late 1990s by the 19th Liaison School Group at Focsani. Most surviving airframes were sold to private owners in the USA.

== Aircraft on display ==
A number of aircraft are preserved and on display:

- c/n 01 at the National Military Museum in Bucharest
- c/n 15 and 19 at the National Aviation Museum in Bucharest
- c/n 37, registration YR-MEH, at the Clinceni Airfield, near Bucharest
- c/n 51 at the Henry Coanda Air Force Academy in Braṣov

== Specifications ==
Data from Jane's All The World's Aircraft 1980–81

General characteristics

- Crew: Two, pilot and instructor
- Capacity: 3 passengers
- Length: 8.24 m (27 ft 0 in)
- Wingspan: 10.00 m (32 ft 10 in)
- Height: 2.52 m (8 ft 3 in)
- Wing area: 15.00 m^{2} (161.5 sq ft)
- Airfoil: NACA 23012 (modified)
- Empty weight: 900 kg (1,984 lb)
- Max takeoff weight: 1,500 kg (3,307 lb)
- Fuel capacity: 360 L (95 US gal; 79 imp gal) (internal)
- Powerplant: 1 × Lycoming IO-540-G1D5 air-cooled flat-six engine, 216 kW (290 hp)

Performance

- Maximum speed: 310 km/h (190 mph, 170 kn) at sea level
- Cruise speed: 290 km/h (180 mph, 160 kn) (economy cruise, at 60% power)
- Stall speed: 98 km/h (61 mph, 53 kn) (flaps down, power off)
- Never exceed speed: 400 km/h (250 mph, 220 kn)
- Range: 1,800 km (1,100 mi, 970 nmi)
- Endurance: 6 hr
- Service ceiling: 5,600 m (18,400 ft)
- g limits: +6, −3G
- Rate of climb: 7.49 m/s (1,475 ft/min)
