= Dan Roman (businessman) =

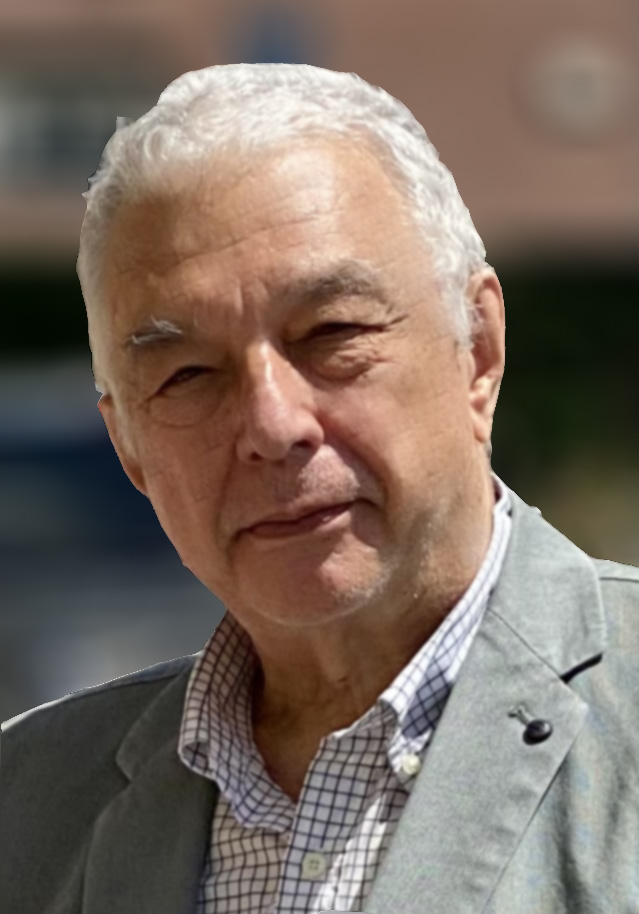
- Occupations: Entrepreneur, investor and IT professional

Dan Nicolae Roman is a Romanian information technology (IT) professional, entrepreneur, executive and investor, known for his work in Central European markets, the Western Balkans, and the Black Sea Region. He has held prominent roles in both public and private sectors, contributing to the advancement of software engineering, IT services, and business development in Romania and internationally.

== Early life and education ==
Dan Roman obtained a PhD in Computer Science in 1981 from the Politehnica University of Bucharest, Romania. His early career began in research, where he served in various capacities at the Research Institute for Computers (ITC) in Romania. Between 1973 and 1989, he progressed from Researcher to Director of Software Engineering, overseeing the development of critical software infrastructure, including operating systems, compilers, and application software.

== Professional career ==
Research Institute for Computers (ITC)

At ITC, Roman introduced and led several innovative projects. He was among the first in Romania to advocate for Computer-Aided Design (CAD) and Computer Graphics as key areas of Research & Development. Under his leadership, the institute developed and exported software packages internationally. In 1984, he established an Artificial Intelligence (AI) and Speech Recognition Technology Lab, collaborating with experts from the University Politehnica of Bucharest.

Roman also expanded the Institute's national presence by establishing software development branches in several university centres, including Iasi, Suceava, Satu Mare, and Brasov. Many of these branches evolved into affiliates of the Romanian Academy or independent companies.

Romanian Business Systems and IBM

In 1990, Roman founded one of Romania's first private IT companies, Romanian Business Systems (RBS), which became an IBM Alliance Company and a leader in the local market. He served as CEO until 1995, when IBM acquired RBS, and Roman became the first Country General Manager of IBM Romania after IBM's return to the country.

Roman's role expanded in 1996 when he was appointed Director of Operations for Non-subsidiary Countries of IBM Central and Eastern Europe (CEE) in Vienna. In this capacity, he oversaw the IBM partner network across a range of countries and was instrumental in setting up IBM subsidiaries in the region.

eNet Data GmbH and S&T Group

In 2000, Roman founded the Austrian company eNet Data GmbH, which was acquired by the publicly listed IT company S&T in 2002. He then joined S&T as Senior Vice President and General Manager for the South region, transforming S&T Romania into a technological hub for subsidiaries across Southeastern Europe, including Bulgaria, Greece, Turkey, Malta, and Cyprus.

Roman also led S&T's strategic mergers and acquisitions (M&A) in the region, helping the company grow into a major player in the Southeastern European IT market.

Kapsch BusinessCom / CANCOM

In 2011, Roman joined Kapsch BusinessCom, an Austrian IT company, where he was responsible for building and expanding Kapsch Romania. Under his leadership, Kapsch Romania became a recognized provider of complex ICT solutions in the local IT market and contributed to international projects of the Kapsch Group. In 2015, Roman was appointed Senior Executive for International Business Development for Kapsch BusinessCom Group, now known as CANCOM.

== Diplomatic and service roles ==
From 1994 to 1998, Dan Roman served as Honorary Consul of the Republic of Cyprus in Romania. Additionally, between 2005 and 2014, he acted as a Counsellor and Secretary in the Diplomatic Mission of the Sovereign Order of Malta in Romania. Roman is a Past President and an active member of Rotary Club “Bucharest Old Court” District 2241.

== Awards and honours ==
Roman has received numerous awards in recognition of his contribution to the IT industry and public service, including:

- Order of the Star of Romania with the rank of Knight, awarded for his contribution to science, research and the development of information and communication technology in Romania.

- Order Pro Merito Melitensi in two ranks, awarded by the Sovereign Military Order of Malta for his promotion of Christian values and charity work.

- IDG - International Data Group Excellence Award (2001)

- Bucharest Business Week “Austrian Awards for Excellence” (2008)

- Club IT&C “Best in IT – IT Industry Pioneer” (2009)
