= IEEE Communications Letters =

Academic journal

- Discipline: Communications technology
- Language: English
- Edited by: Daniel Benevides da Costa

Publication details
- History: 1997-present
- Publisher: IEEE Communications Society
- Frequency: Monthly
- Impact factor: 4.1 (2022)

Standard abbreviations
- ISO 4: IEEE Commun. Lett.

Indexing
- CODEN: ICLEF6
- ISSN: 1089-7798
- LCCN: 97652806
- OCLC no.: 35127453

Links
- Journal homepage; Online access

IEEE Communications Letters is a peer-reviewed scientific journal published monthly by the IEEE Communications Society since 1997 and covering communications technology. The editor-in-chief is Daniel Benevides da Costa (Technology Innovation Institute). According to the Journal Citation Reports, it has a 2022 impact factor of 4.1.
