= M.R. (automobile) =

M.R. was a microcar model built in 1945 by Industria Aeronautică Română in Braşov, Romania.

== History ==
Developed by Radu Manicatide, M.R. featured a RR layout with an 11.5 bhp (8.6 kW), 2-cylinder engine and had an aerodynamic/convertible design. Another model, a three-wheeler with an air-cooled engine, as made in 1957. Neither model made it into production.
