= GeCAD Software =

GECAD Software was a Romanian's Computer Aided Design (CAD) software development company established in 1992 by Radu Georgescu. Over time, GECAD's focus shifted from CAD software to security-related software, mainly antivirus software. Its most prominent product, Reliable Antivirus, or RAV, was first developed in 1994. In 2003, after amassing over 10 million users in 60 countries worldwide, the technology was acquired by Microsoft. In 2004, GECAD Software reshaped its entire business and became GECAD Group.

Now, GECAD Group invests in companies with high growth potential with the ability to innovate and deliver new ideas and products in their markets. Investment is focused primarily on software and hi-tech companies, including security software, cloud technologies, eCommerce, cryptocurrencies, and payment methods. In 2005, the GECAD Group invested in founding the Avangate eCommerce payments platform.

GECAD Group permanently invests in new businesses.
