= Gypsy International Recognition and Compensation Action =

The Gypsy International Recognition and Compensation Action is a human rights organization seeking justice on behalf of the Romani people (Gypsies) for the crimes of the Porajmos.

In 2002, it filed suit against IBM for IBM's involvement with Nazi war crimes. The suit was filed after author Edwin Black provided documentation in his book IBM and the Holocaust that IBM machines were tailored for the Nazis to track their victims, including Gypsies.

In 2006, the Swiss Supreme Court judges dismissed the lawsuit because too much time had elapsed. An earlier Swiss court said the charges against IBM were likely to be sustained.

== See also ==
- Environmental racism in Europe
