= Dehomag =

German subsidiary of IBM

DEHOMAG
- Type: Subsidiary
- Industry: Computing
- Founded: 1910; 116 years ago
- Defunct: 1949
- Headquarters: Berlin and Sindelfingen
- Parent: IBM

Dehomag was a German subsidiary of IBM and later a standalone company with a monopoly in the German market before and during World War II. The word was a syllabic abbreviation for Deutsche Hollerith-Maschinen GmbH (English: German Hollerith Machines LLC). Hollerith refers to the German-American inventor of the technology of punched cards, Herman Hollerith. In April 1949 the company name was changed to IBM Deutschland.

== Background ==
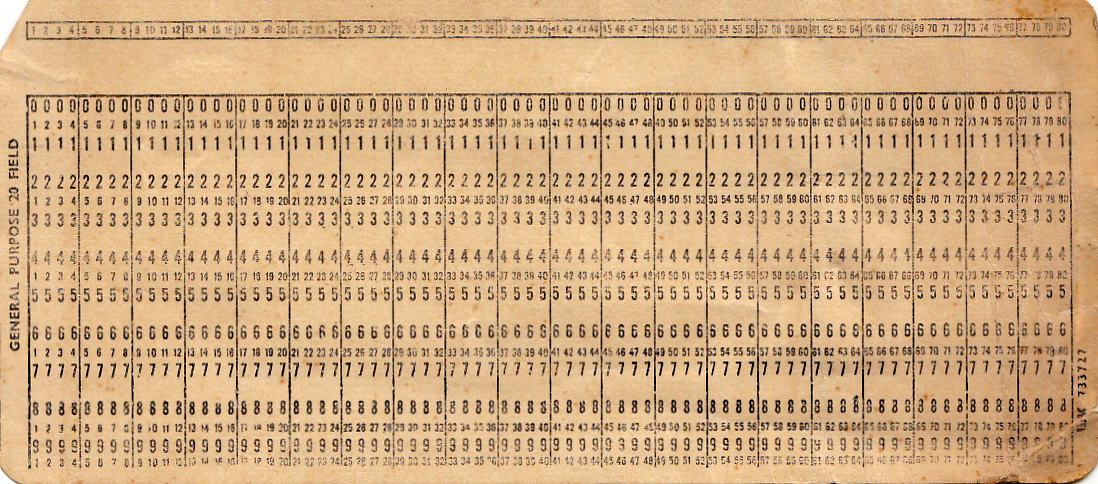
A general-purpose punched card from the mid twentieth century.

The technology of punched cards dates back to the 18th century when it was used for mass production of woven textiles and later used as a recording and playback system in player pianos. The use of punched cards for recording and tabulating data was first proposed and used by Semyon Korsakov around 1805. In 1832 Charles Babbage proposed using similar cards to program and to store computations for his calculating engine. Punched card technology was further developed for data-processing by Herman Hollerith from the 1880s. It was used for the 1890 United States census and for the census work of several foreign governments.

== Early history ==
Willy Heidinger, an acquaintance of Hollerith, licensed all of Hollerith's The Tabulating Machine Company patents in 1910, and created Dehomag in Germany. In 1911 The Tabulating Machine Company was amalgamated (via stock acquisition) with three others, creating a fifth company, the Computing-Tabulating-Recording Company (CTR). In 1923 CTR acquired 90% ownership of Dehomag, thus acquiring patents developed by them. In 1924 CTR was renamed IBM.

== Participation in the Holocaust ==
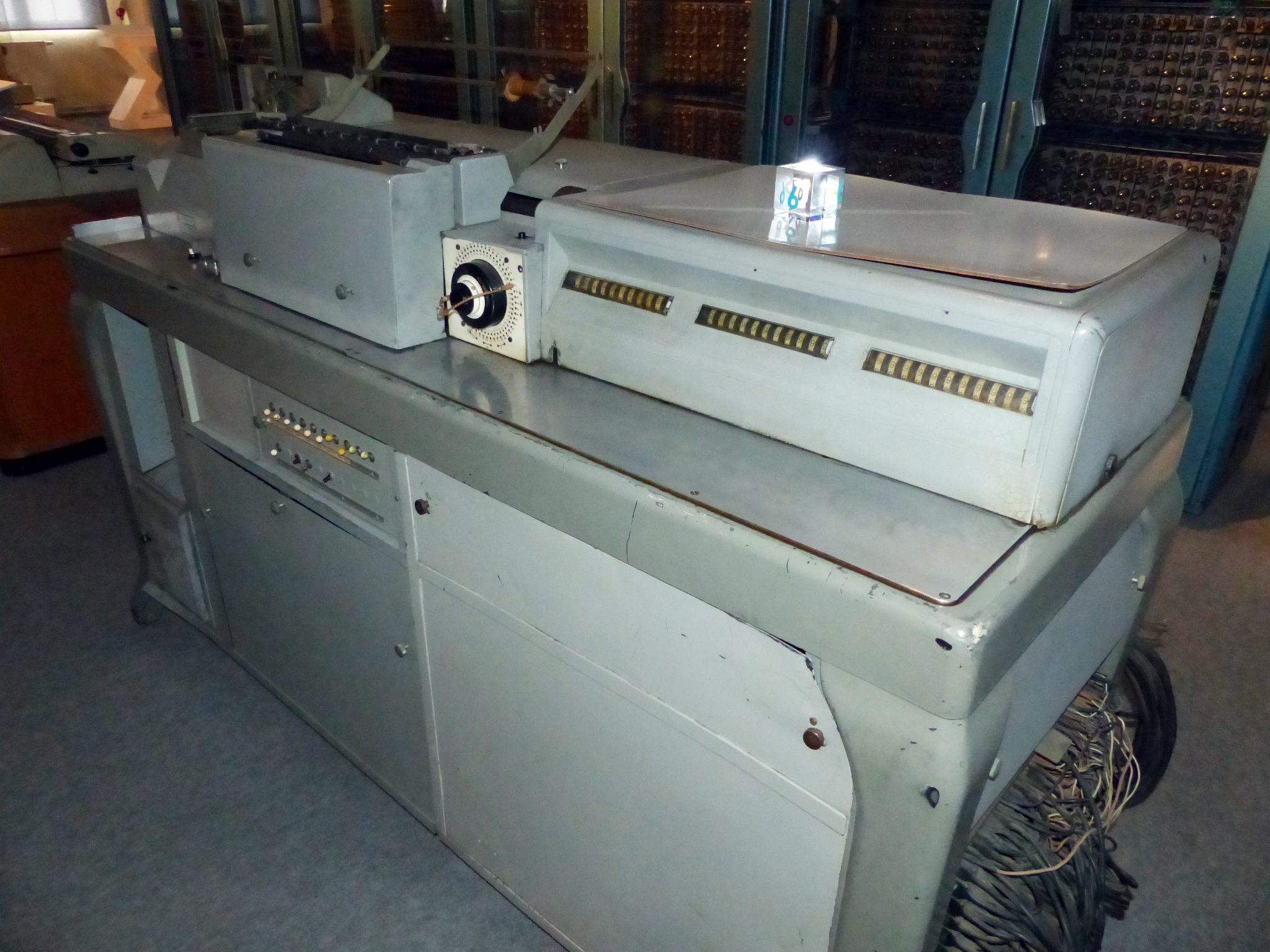
Tabulating machine D11, the first universal numerical tabulating machine. Such machines were used by the Nazi German administration in organizing documents related to the Holocaust.

As an IBM subsidiary, Dehomag became the main provider of computing expertise and equipment in Nazi Germany. Dehomag gave the German government the means for two official censuses of the population after 1933 and for searching its data. The government of Nazi Germany used the tabulating machines that Dehomag received before violent events like Kristallnacht for tracing Jews and dissidents. It enabled them to search databases rapidly and efficiently, and the methods were used throughout occupied Europe by the Gestapo and others to locate and arrest its victims, contributing to the Holocaust.

Dehomag leased and maintained the German government's punched card machines. Before World War II, Dehomag's general manager for Germany, Hermann Rottke, reported directly to IBM President Thomas J. Watson in New York. It was legal for companies in the United States to conduct business with Germany directly until the country entered the war in December 1941. Watson had received the Order of the German Eagle medal at the Berlin ICC meeting in 1937, but after Nazis' pogroms against Jews started in 1938 Watson wanted to distance himself and IBM from Germans but was convinced not to do so by United States Secretary of State Cordell Hull and gave up on the idea until spring of 1940.

IBM New York established a special subsidiary in the occupied General Government territory, Watson Business Machines, to deal with railway traffic there during the Holocaust in Nazi occupied Poland. The German Transport Ministry used IBM machines under the New York-controlled subsidiary in Warsaw, not the German subsidiary. Watson Business Machines operated a punch card printing shop near the Warsaw Ghetto. The punch cards bore the indicia of the German subsidiary Dehomag.

Leon Krzemieniecki, the last surviving person involved in the administration of the rail transportation to Auschwitz and Treblinka, stated he knew the punched card machines were not German machines, because the labels were in English. Income from the machines leased in General Government was sent through Geneva to IBM in New York.

== See also ==
- List of international subsidiaries of IBM
- History of IBM
- IBM during World War II
