= Zionism in the Age of the Dictators =

1983 book by Lenni Brenner

- Author: Lenni Brenner
- Language: English
- Genre: Historical writing
- Publisher: Croom Helm Ltd
- Publication date: 1983
- Publication place: England
- Media type: Book
- Pages: 334 pages
- ISBN: 978-0985890995

Zionism in the Age of the Dictators is a 1983 work by the American free-lance journalist and author Lenni Brenner arguing that Zionist leaders collaborated with fascism, particularly in Nazi Germany, in order to build up a Jewish presence in Palestine.

Zionism in the Age of the Dictators is one of two works by Brenner on the alleged collaboration between Zionism and Nazism. Brenner returns to this topic in his 2002 work 51 Documents: Zionist Collaboration with the Nazis.

The author is Jewish, a Trotskyist, and an outspoken pro-Palestinian activist.

== Argument of the book ==
For Brenner, Zionism emerged from within 19th century conservative nationalism, sharing with it both its ideology of Blut und Boden and its racist assumptions. Like classic antisemites, early Zionists, (Note: Brenner cites Chaim Weizmann's remark that, "we too are in agreement with the cultural anti-Semites, in so far as we believed that Germans of the Mosaic faith are an undesirable, demoralizing phenomena." (Brenner 1983, p. 34, Obenzinger 1983, p. 87)) he claims, considered antisemitism to be the fault of Jews themselves, as putative rootless "intruders" trying to assimilate and exploiting socialist movements to do so. Only in Palestine, Zionists argued, could Jews become a healthy race. (Note: "If one believes in the validity of racial exclusiveness, it is difficult to object to anyone else's racism. If one believes further that it is impossible for any people to be healthy except in their own homeland, then one cannot object to anyone else excluding 'aliens' from their territory." (Brenner 1983, p. 25, Obenzinger 1983, p. 86))

Brenner notes that Theodor Herzl himself confided to his diary that he tried to win over Germany's Kaiser Wilhelm to Zionism by arguing that the movement would subtract Jews from revolutionary parties by relocating them abroad. Zionism's contempt for socialism led its leaders to repeatedly cooperate with conservative nationalist movements to suppress this perceived threat.

Brenner charges that the World Zionist Organization's abandonment of the idea that Jews in the diaspora were worth helping played a consequential role in the fate that later befel the Jews. To this end he cites several documents, one of which is a memorandum of the Zionist Federation of Germany sent to the Nazi Party soon after Hitler became Chancellor. In it German Zionists undertook to ensure that Jews would thenceforth avoid "becoming the rootless critics of the national foundations of German essence," for

a rebirth of national life, such as is occurring in German life through adhesion to Christian and national values, must also take place in the Jewish national group.

Brenner states that, after the passage of the Nuremberg Laws in 1935, Zionism was the one Jewish organization permitted to exist in Germany, and its flag the only one allowed to fly next to the Nazi banner. He reads the Ha'avara Agreement negotiated between Zionists and the Nazis as a subversion of the Anti-Nazi boycott promoted by the diaspora Jewish mainstream.

Zionists, in Brenner's interpretation, were so intent on colonizing Palestine with Jews, that they prioritized emigration there over any other form of rescuing Jews. To this end, Brenner cites a remark made by David Ben-Gurion in the wake of Kristallnacht when great Britain laid out a proposal to convey thousands of Jewish children at risk to the safety of its shores. Ben-Gurion commented

If I knew that it would be possible to save all the children in Germany by bringing them over to England, and only half of them by transporting them to Eretz Yisrael, then I would opt for the second alternative.

Likewise, in the United States in 1943 Brenner states that rabbi Stephen Wise opposed a congressional bill designed to create a rescue commission for Jews because it failed to mention Palestine.

Brenner concludes his book by a chapter on the Stern gang – which had broken away from the Irgun – and its efforts to forge an alliance with the Nazis against Great Britain, on the basis that the gang viewed itself as a totalitarian nationalist movement in the German mould. Suppressed as a terrorist group during the war, the reviewer notes, in the postwar era, one of its leaders, Yitzhak Shamir rose to become Prime Minister of Israel, and the former Irgun militant, Menachem Begin, on becoming prime minister, honoured the gang's founder, Avraham Stern by having a postage stamp with his portrait printed.

=== Positive reviews ===
Upon its initial publication the book received a positive review in The Times, with Edward Mortimer describing it as "crisp and carefully documented".

An anonymous Merip reviewer, himself a refugee from the Holocaust, called the book extremely important, and "singular" in outlining an argument that Zionism with its intention of ensuring the survival of Jews interacted symbiotically with antisemites and movements rooted in extreme hatred of Jews. Brenner drew on ample documentation whose contents were known, but existed only in obscure journals (Note: Speaking of the Ha'avara Agreement, Breindel remarks that, "It has been treated in various articles and relatively obscure books, (as well as in the best-known and most authoritative general study of the Holocaust, The War Against the Jews by Lucy Dawidowicz." (Breindel 1985, pp. 39–40)) and books that were otherwise difficult to access. He was nonetheless critical of Brenner's "hectoring second-guessing of nearly every move made by the Jewish leadership during the fascist and Nazi era", on the grounds that not many options existed in that phase of Jewish history. There was, he concludes, no need for "sledge-hammer moralizing" for "(w)e don't need it. The evidence compiled in this book speaks quite eloquently for itself."

Writing for the Journal of Palestine Studies, Hilton Obenzinger prefaced his remarks by noting from personal experience the atmosphere of hostility that surrounded any attempt to address the Palestinian issue in public: rational debate quickly broke down into a "screaming bedlam". (Note: "Any mention of Zionist collaboration with the Nazis, as anyone who has spoken about the Palestinian issue in public forums in the US can attest, can easily throw a rational meetingt into a screaming bedlam." (Obenzinger 1983, p. 85)) Reading the book, he opines, will shake the moral credibility of Zionist claims to be defenders of the Jews. For Obenzinger Brenner's meticulous documentation expressed an intention to disarm criticism of a thesis that would be considered controversial, and ward off the "barrage of abuse" its publication would inevitably excite.

Gilbert Achcar, surveying the literature on the period of interaction between Zionists and Germany, argues that both movements deeply disliked each other, each striving to use the other for their respective purposes, which crossed over in a common interest in removing Jews from Germany. While referring the reader to Brenner's work, which he appraises as a "vigorous indictment", he draws attention to Francis R. Nicosia's critique of Brenner's study. (Note: Brenner had earlier criticized Nicosia's detailed study The Third Reich and the Palestine Question: Germany's Relations with Zionism, Arab Nationalism and British Imperialism (1985), which mentions his own book only in the bibliography, for its dispassionate attachment to dry archival minutiae at the expense of engaging in value judgments, though he assessed Nicosia's close focus on Nazi racist views on Jews and Arabs as of real value.)

=== Negative reviews ===
C.C. Aronsfeld, of the Institute of Jewish Affairs in a review published in the journal International Affairs, criticized the book concluding that "Brenner has produced a party political tract that unhinges the balance of history by ignoring too many difficulties, especially psychological. For once Stalinists will be pleased with the work of a Trotskyist."

In his review for The New Republic of Edwin Black's The Transfer Agreement, Eric Breindel accused Brenner of defaming Zionism, of misinterpreting the single Stern gang proposal, and also added that the Institute for Historical Review, which asserted that the Holocaust was a hoax, was promoting Brenner's work. Brenner duly replied but The New Republic refused to publish his letter. (Note: In a letter to the New Republic Brenner responded to Breindel's remarks, correcting the latter's assertion that the Stern gang had simply proposed the transfer of Jews to Palestine in exchange for an undertaking to rid Palestine of the British forces. The Stern gang's proposal, Brenner noted, actually offered to side with Nazi Germany on the basis of a perceived identity of national aims (Cockburn 1985, p. 789).) Alexander Cockburn, writing in defense of Brenner, stated that Breindel's insinuation that Brenner and the Institute for Historical Review were in sympathy flew in the face of the fact that Brenner acknowledged the slaughter of the Shoah and had publicly encouraged people to bust up meetings by that institute.

Bryan Cheyette reviewed it for the journal Patterns of Prejudice. (Note: Cheyette snubbed it 33 years later as "about as historically accurate as J. K. Rowling's Harry Potter novels." (Cheyette 2016)) He writes that the book was a "crude ...pseudo-scholarly" piece of left-wing revisionism, and classified it as an example of a trend towards "pathological anti-Zionism" that arose in the wake of the UN declaration (1975) equating racism and Zionism, which moreover Brenner indicts for failing to mobilize the working classes against antisemitism. Because Brenner does not discuss the Israeli-Palestinian conflict he is "fictionalizing Zionism". After listing and disagreeing with Brenner's estimations of several historical figures, Cheyette concludes by deploring in the strongest terms the fact that the book was distributed by a respectable British publisher.

In a review for Fathom magazine, Paul Bogdanor, author of Kasztner's Crime, describes the book as "an antisemitic hoax". On Lehi's offer to Nazi Germany, Bogdanor argues that Stern believed at the time that Hitler only wanted to deport Jews to Madagascar, not to murder them. During the Holocaust some groups and individuals, like the Working Group in Slovakia and Joel Brand, tried to bribe Nazi officials to stop or slow down the Holocaust. Bogdanor argues that the Nazis never intended to actually stop their genocide, and that had Brand 'succeeded', "precious time would have been squandered in doomed negotiations with the Nazis while the deportations continued, and nothing would have remained of Hungary’s Jewish population by the end of July 1944." In short, he concludes that Brenner falsified history and produced "hideous libel".

=== Criticism of Brenner from the left ===
Socialist writer Gerry Ben-Noah wrote a critical review for the Trotskyist Workers' Liberty. Ben-Noah argues that Brenner "creates a fantasy world in which the Zionists did wish for and expect the Holocaust, and in which the most fanatical Jewish nationalists were in reality, ardent anti-semites". Highly critical of the argument that "Zionists saw anti-semites as nationalists like themselves with a common objective in the removal of Jews from Europe", Ben-Noah asks rhetorically, "Where does one begin to review work like this?"

== Ken Livingstone controversy ==
Brenner is on record since the 1980s as being highly critical of the exploitation of his research by neo-Nazi Holocaust deniers. On the occasion of a controversy that broke out when the former Mayor of London Ken Livingstone cited Brenner's book as the source for his view that Hitler supported Zionism, (Note: Brenner's book cited Hitler's remark in his Mein Kampf that there was: "a great movement... which came out sharply in confirmation of the national character of the Jews: this was the Zionists." (Brenner 1983, p. 79, Obenzinger 1983, p. 87) Livingstone argued that Zionism in the Age of the Dictators "confirms there was clearly an ongoing dialogue [between Zionists and Nazis] even if the Israeli government now tries to pretend that none of that all happened".(Quinn 2016); "Livingstone told the world that when 'Hitler won his election in 1932, his policy then was that Jews should be moved to Israel.' He added: 'He was supporting Zionism – this before he went mad and ended up killing six million Jews'.") both David Hirsh and the historian Thomas Weber lambasted Brenner's work, commenting that, in their view, it was a sourcebook for antizionists and anti-Semites, and lay outside the academic mainstream. (Note: "a fixture of antizionist and antisemitic propaganda about the Holocaust on both the far left and on the far right, and Brenner has a cult following among those convinced that 'Zionists' are to blame for all evil in the world." (Hirsh 2017); "Brenner's book lies well outside academic mainstream. It is mostly celebrated either by the extreme left and by the neo-Nazi right" (Quinn 2016).) Weber also asserted that Brenner's book was not taken seriously by mainstream scholarship, and that the Institute for Historical Review cited the book in their research. David Rosenberg, Jewish anti-Zionist activist in the Jewish Socialists' Group, supporter of Jews for Justice for Palestinians, and a Labour Party member, stated that Zionism in the Age of the Dictators is "badly written and with poor scholarship – a piece of tabloid journalism glued together with selective facts and lots of conjecture".

On being subsequently suspended from the Labour Party, Livingstone indicated that he intended to use Brenner's work when appealing his suspension.

== Influence ==
The book served as inspiration for the controversial 1987 play Perdition, which was cancelled due to allegations of antisemitism. (Note: "Jim Allen was inspired by Brenner to write Perdition, a play which was produced at the Royal Court Theatre in 1987." (Hirsh 2017, p. 16)) The playwright, Jim Allen, referred to the book as a "goldmine source". David Cesarani, commenting on Allen's admission that Brenner's work was a key inspiration for his play, asserted that,

Many of his "facts" and "quotations" had been pre-selected and edited by Brenner to fit the well-established anti-Zionist argument that Israel is a "racist" state governed by a fascist (Yitzhak Shamir), the origins of which can be explicated by reference to parallels between Nazi and Zionist ideology and instances of concrete collaboration.

== Sources ==
- Achcar, Gilbert (2010). The Arabs and the Holocaust: The Arab-Israeli War of Narratives. Henry Holt and Company. ISBN 978-1-429-93820-4.
- Aronsfeld, C. C. (1983). "Reviewed work: Zionism in the Age of the Dictators: A Reappraisal., Lenni Brenner". International Affairs. 60 (1): 138–139. doi:10.2307/2618977. JSTOR 2618977.
- Ben-Noah, G. (4 October 1984). "Brenner on the Nazi Massacre" (PDF). Workers' Liberty Pamphlet. Workers' Liberty.
- Breindel, Eric (18 February 1985). "The Price of Rescue". The New Republic. Vol. 192. pp. 39–42. ProQuest 198724976.
- Brenner, Lenni (1983). Zionism in the Age of the Dictators. Croom Helm. ISBN 978-0-882-08163-2.
- Brenner, Lenni (Autumn 1986). "Review: Nazis, Zionists, and Arabs". Journal of Palestine Studies. 16 (1): 143–145. doi:10.2307/2537031. JSTOR 2537031.
- Brenner, Lenni (2015). "Letter to the Editor". Holy Land Studies. 14 (2): 14.2 (2015): 235–237. doi:10.3366/hlps.2015.0123.
- "Brenner, Zionism in the Age of the Dictators". Middle East Report (129). MERIP. January 1985.
- Cesarani, David (1990). "The Perdition Affair". In Wistrich, Robert S. (ed.). Anti-Zionism and Antisemitism in the Contemporary World. Palgrave Macmillan. pp. 53–60. doi:10.1007/978-1-349-11262-3_5. ISBN 978-1-349-11264-7.
- Cheyette, Bryan (1983). "Pathological anti-Zionism and the 'revisionism' of the left". Patterns of Prejudice. 17 (3): 49–51. doi:10.1080/0031322X.1983.9969723.
- Cheyette, Bryan (22 June 2016). "Trust Chakrabarti to spot 'anti-Semitic anti-Zionism'". The Jerusalem Post.
- Cockburn, Alexander (29 June 1985). "One -way street". The Nation. Vol. 240. p. 789.
- Davis, Uri (July 1985). "Book review: Zionism in the Age of the Dictators: a reappraisal by Lenni Brenner, and The Iron Wall by Lenni Brenner". Race & Class. 27 (2): 91–96. doi:10.1177/030639688502700106. S2CID 144901468.
- Greenstein, Tony (November 2014). "Zionist-Nazi Collaboration and the Holocaust: A Historical Aberration? Lenni Brenner Revisited". Holy Land Studies. 13 (2): 187–212. doi:10.3366/hls.2014.0089.
- Hirsh, David (2017). Contemporary left antisemitism. Routledge. ISBN 978-1-138-23530-4.
- Miner, Samuel (Fall 2016). "Planning the Holocaust in the Middle East: Nazi Designs to Bomb Jewish Cities in Palestine". Jewish Political Studies Review. 27 (3/4): 7–33. JSTOR 44510568.
- Mortimer, Edward (11 February 1984). "Contradiction, collusion and controversy". The Times. p. 14 – via Times Digital Archive.
- Nicosia, Francis R. (1985). The Third Reich and the Palestine Question. University of Texas Press. ISBN 978-1-850-43010-0.
- Nicosia, Francis R. (1989). "Victims as Perpetrators: German Zionism and Collaboration in Recent Historical Controversy". In Bauer, Yehuda (ed.). Remembering for the Future: The Impact of the Holocaust on the Contemporary World. Vol. 2. Pergamon Press. pp. 2134–2148. ISBN 978-0-080-36754-5.
- Obenzinger, Hilton (Summer 1983). "Review: Collusion with Dictators". Journal of Palestine Studies. 12 (4): 85–90. doi:10.2307/2536249. JSTOR 2536249.
- Quinn, Ben (29 April 2016). "Ken Livingstone cites Marxist book in defence of Israel comments". The Guardian.
- Seidel, Gill (1986). The Holocaust Denial: Antisemitism, Racism & the New Right. Beyond the Pale Collective. ISBN 978-0-950-96361-7.
- Watkinson, William (30 April 2016). "Benjamin Netanyahu and Lenni Brenner: What is Ken Livingstone basing his Hitler-Zionist comments on?". International Business Times UK.
