= The Transfer Agreement =

1984 book by Edwin Black

- Author: Edwin Black
- Language: English
- Subject: History, politics
- Publisher: Dialog Press
- Publication date: 1984
- Publication place: United States
- Pages: 194
- ISBN: 0-914153-13-7

The Transfer Agreement: The Dramatic Story of the Pact Between the Third Reich and Jewish Palestine is a 1984 book written by Edwin Black, documenting the 1933 Ha’avara Agreement between representatives of the Jewish Agency, other Zionist economic bodies and Nazi Germany, which enabled some German Jews to emigrate to Mandatory Palestine and recover part of their assets through the export of German goods.

== Background ==
Black is the son of Holocaust survivors from Poland. In The Transfer Agreement, he notes that following in the beliefs of his parents, he was from his earliest days a supporter of the State of Israel.

In 1978, as a young journalist, Black interviewed the American Civil Liberties Union lawyer who represented members of the American Nazi Party, which had marched provocatively through the predominantly Jewish Chicago suburb of Skokie. In preparing himself for that interview, Black's interest was piqued by the hidden history of relations between the government of Adolf Hitler and German-Jewish Zionists during the first years of the Nazi regime. Five years of research followed, ending in publication of The Transfer Agreement.

== Main thesis ==
This book documents the agreement between Nazi Germany and an organization of German Zionists in 1933 to salvage some German Jewish assets and the voluntary emigration of German Jews to Palestine before the Third Reich implemented expulsion and then extermination. The Transfer Agreement rescued some 60,000 German Jews. A sweeping, worldwide economic boycott of Germany by Jews helped spur a deal between the Nazis and Zionists.

The book also documents the controversy within the Zionist movement and Jewish diaspora over the agreement, which Black shows "tore apart the Jewish world in the pre-World War II era". In particular, it describes the conflict between, on one side, German Zionists and German-descended communal leaders in the US, who argued for the agreement, and, on the other side, the mainstream Eastern European-descended American Jewish Zionist leaders (such as the American Jewish Committee and Jewish War Veterans) who opposed the agreement and argued instead for a full boycott of Nazi Germany.

== Reception ==
After its publication, the book was cited by far-right activist Lyndon LaRouche and Nation of Islam leader Louis Farrakhan to claim that Zionism was a racist movement that collaborated with Nazi Germany so that wealthy Germans could transfer their assets to Palestine.

In a review in the academic journal Shofar, scholar Lawrence Baron noted the controversy generated by Black's conclusion that the World Zionist Organization (WZO) broke the potentially successful anti-Nazi boycott of Germany to fortify the Jewish presence in Palestine. Baron described the book as "a well-written and diligently documented narrative"; however, he stated it indulged in dubious retrospective speculation and cast unfair aspersions on the motives of those who defended the WZO. To Baron, Black's portrayal of the Zionist leadership's strategy as "one-sided", with his criticisms "ahistorical and simplistic".

Historians Ben Halpern and Henry Feingold wrote highly critical reviews. Historian Richard S. Levy in Commentary wrote, "[Black] relies on outmoded secondary works, makes numerous errors, and distorts his subject [...] Black’s neglect of the secondary scholarly literature is perverse and leads him to his most serious error of judgment—drastic overestimation of the political and economic efficacy of the boycott weapon." He further described the book as "conspiracy-mongering, innuendo, and sensationalism."

== Awards ==
- 1985 Carl Sandburg Award of the Friends of the Chicago Public Library for best non-fiction book of 1984 for the book The Transfer Agreement.

== See also ==
- IBM and the Holocaust
- Zionism in the Age of the Dictators
- 51 Documents: Zionist Collaboration with the Nazis
- The Other Side: The Secret Relationship Between Nazism and Zionism
