= Comparisons between Israel and Nazi Germany =

Comparisons between Israel and Nazi Germany occur frequently in the political discourse of anti-Zionism and as part of the broader criticism of Israel. Given the legacy of the Holocaust, the nature of these comparisons, and particularly whether they constitute antisemitism, is a matter of fervent controversy.

Comparisons between Zionism and Nazism have been made by academics, politicians, journalists, and public figures, both Jewish and not, since before the establishment of Israel. Some scholars suggest these comparisons can be rhetorical tools without any specific antisemitic intent, or that they can be an informed and necessary response to Israeli policies or actions. Others state such comparisons lack historical and moral equivalence, risk inciting antisemitism and may serve as a form of Holocaust inversion, denial or minimisation.

During the 20th century, a wide variety of political figures and governments, especially those on the left, have invoked comparisons between Israel or Zionism, and Nazism. In the 21st century, politicians who have made such comparisons include Turkish president Recep Tayyip Erdoğan, Brazilian president Luiz Inácio Lula da Silva, Venezuelan president Hugo Chávez, Colombian president Gustavo Petro and others.

== 20th century ==
=== 1940s ===
Comparisons between Zionism and Nazism predate the foundation of Israel in 1948. In 1945, British Army officer and politician Edward Spears compared political Zionism to the Nazi idea of Lebensraum. German-Jewish linguist and anti-fascist Victor Klemperer, who survived the Holocaust and chose not to move to Israel but to stay in Germany after 1945, wrote in his LTI - Lingua Tertii Imperii (The Language of the Third Reich) that both Zionism and Nazism are essentially neo-Romantic nationalist ideologies.

In 1948, Hannah Arendt, Albert Einstein and a number of other Jewish public figures signed an open letter which compared Tnuat Haherut, an early Jewish nationalist political party founded by Menachem Begin, to Nazism. Arendt's views on Zionism and Israel varied widely over time, while Einstein supported the idea of a Jewish homeland in Palestine, but not that of a Jewish state.

English historian Arnold J. Toynbee originally compared Zionism to Nazism, but later reconsidered this view. Following critical responses by Jacob Talmon and Eliezer Berkovits, Toynbee decided his prior condemnation of Zionism was disproportionate in this regard.

=== 1960s ===
In the context of the Six-Day War, official statements by the Soviet Union administration compared Israeli tactics to those of Nazi Germany during the Second World War. After the victory of Likud in the 1977 Israeli legislative election, Holocaust metaphors began to be used by the Israeli right-wing to describe their left-wing opponents.

=== 1980s ===
Israeli philosopher Yeshayahu Leibowitz introduced the term "Judeo-Nazis", suggesting that continued military occupation of the Palestinian territories would lead to the moral degradation of the Israeli Defense Force (IDF), with individuals committing atrocities for state security interests. In 2018, Noam Chomsky said of Leibowitz's prediction, "I think that's what you are seeing in Israel."

During the 1982 Lebanon War, Holocaust survivor Primo Levi wrote that he disliked comparisons of Israel to Nazi Germany but that he understood why they were being made.

In 1983, anti-Zionist scholar Boaz Evron said that Zionists should not lose sight of morality in pursuit of a political framework, explaining: "A society that loses its human image has no right to exist, in the long run, as we have seen in the case of Nazi Germany". He said that if such a regime were established in Israel, it would mean "the end of the State of Israel". Later that year, University of Bridgeport international law professor Richard Arens, the brother of Israeli Minister of Defence Moshe Arens, compared Israeli settlement to the Nazi lebensraum.

In 1983, the American freelance journalist Lenni Brenner published Zionism in the Age of the Dictators, in which he argued that Zionist leaders collaborated with fascism, particularly in Nazi Germany, in order to build up a Jewish presence in the region of Palestine.

During the First Intifada, Israeli-American historian Omer Bartov criticized Yitzhak Rabin's call to "break the bones" of Palestinians and wrote him a letter arguing that, based on Bartov's research, the IDF could be brutalized in the same way as the German Army was during World War II. In 1988, Holocaust survivor Yehuda Elkana warned that the tendency in Israel to see all potential threats as existential and all opponents as Nazis would lead to Nazi-like behavior by Jews.

Holocaust historian John K. Roth was involved in a controversy when he wrote in a 1988 op-ed comparing the Israeli right's proposal to expel Palestinians to Nazi policies, suggesting that just as "Kristallnacht happened because a political state decided to be rid of people unwanted within its borders", the same impulse could lead to atrocities committed by Israel.

== 21st century ==
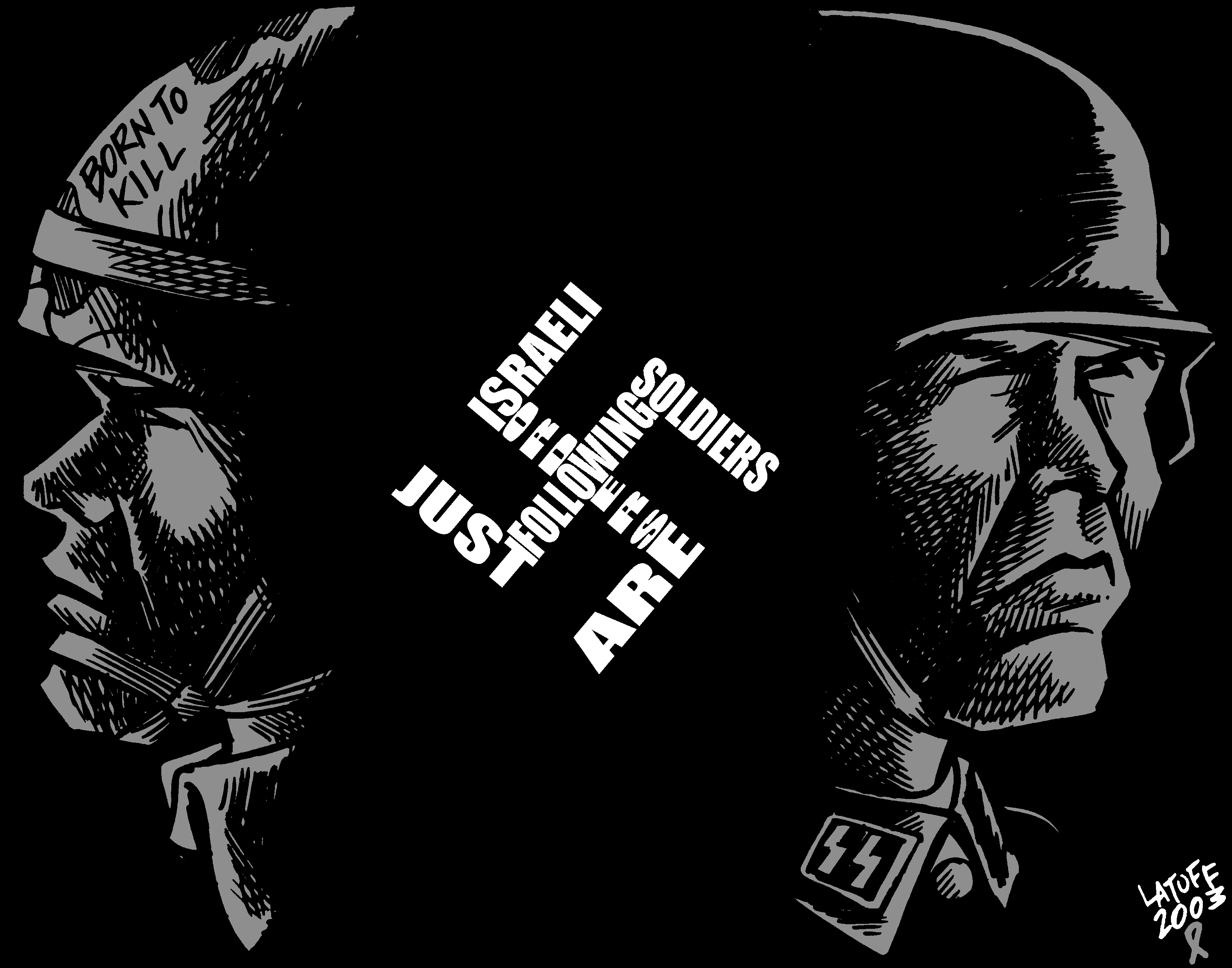
"Israeli soldiers are just following orders" by Carlos Latuff

=== Israel ===
During the Israeli disengagement from the Gaza Strip in 2005, settlers donned yellow stars to compare themselves to Holocaust victims as part of their protests against the disengagement. In a 2024 article for Haaretz, Israeli academics (and former IDF soldiers) Nuphar Ishay-Krien and Yoel Elizur quoted an anonymous soldier who served during the First Intifada as saying, "I felt like, like, like a Nazi ... it looked exactly like we were actually the Nazis and they were the Jews."

In 2016, Yair Golan, the Israeli general and deputy chief of staff of the IDF, sparked a controversy during a speech at Yom HaShoah. Golan alluded to manifestations of processes that occurred in Holocaust-era Europe. After criticism by Prime Minister Benjamin Netanyahu, Golan said that he did not intend to compare Israel to Nazi Germany: "It is an absurd and baseless comparison and I had no intention whatsoever to draw any sort of parallel or to criticize the national leadership. The IDF is a moral army that respects the rules of engagement and protects human dignity." In 2019, he later again compared right-wing Israeli politicians to Nazis and warned that, amid the rise of Israeli right-wing parties, Israel's democracy could be exploited similar to the Nazis' rise to power in Germany. This drew criticism from the right in Israel.

In an interview with Kan radio in August 2023, former Israeli general Amiram Levin accused the IDF of being a "partner in war crimes" and argued that Israel's control of the West Bank is similar to Nazi Germany's discriminatory policies.

On 18 February 2025, Ofer Cassif, a far-left politician of the Knesset and member of the Hadash–Ta'al party, tweeted a comparison between Israel's plans to encourage voluntary migration of Palestinians from Gaza and the flight of the German Jews to other countries during World War II. His tweet was criticised by other Knesset members. For instance, Otzma Yehudit MK Almog Cohen filed a complaint to the Knesset Ethics Committee about "his vile and disgraceful comparison" and called Cassif a "terrorist supporter". In response, right-wing Knesset lawmakers called for Cassif's impeachment.

In January 2026, former Israeli defence minister Moshe Ya'alon posted a tweet on X, comparing Jewish supremacy in Israel to Nazism, stating: "The ideology of 'Jewish supremacy', which has become dominant in the Israeli government, resembles Nazi racial theory." The post came after an increase of Israeli settler attacks against Palestinians in the West Bank and described them as "Jewish pogromists". Ya'alon repeated the comparison in June 2026 on Ynet, saying, "Eighty years after the Holocaust, 'Mein Kampf' in reverse. The master race is us." In April, Tamir Pardo, the former head of Mossad from 2011 to 2016, said on Channel 13 comparing the violence by Israeli settlers in the West Bank to the Holocaust, stating, "My mother was a Holocaust survivor, and what I saw reminded me of the events that happened against Jews in the last century." In August 2026, The New York Times quoted similar assertions from multiple retired Israeli generals and officials.

=== Palestine ===
In August 2022, the President of the State of Palestine, Mahmoud Abbas, accused Israel of having committed "50 Holocausts" during a visit to Berlin, Germany. Abbas had responded to a reporter's question about the upcoming 50th anniversary of the 1972 Munich massacre committed by the internationally active Palestinian militant group Black September, who were at that time affiliated with Abbas' Fatah Party, and whether he intended to apologize for the attack.

Olaf Scholz, the Chancellor of Germany, later condemned Abbas' remarks. He asserted, "Especially for us Germans, any relativization of the Holocaust is unbearable and unacceptable". The German publication Bild labeled the incident as antisemitic. In response, Abbas said his answer was not intended to deny the singularity of the Holocaust, which he stated that he condemned in the strongest terms, but that he had intended to discuss the "crimes and massacres committed against the Palestinian people since the Nakba at the hands of the Israeli forces" in his view.

==== Comparisons between Gaza and the Warsaw Ghetto ====
In a testimony published by Israeli NGO Breaking the Silence, an IDF soldier who served in Operation Protective Edge during the 2014 Gaza War recounted Israel's attacks on Beit Hanoun by saying:

There's that famous photo that they always show on trips to Poland (organized trips in which Israeli youths visit Holocaust memorial sites) that shows Warsaw before the war and Warsaw after the Second World War. The photo shows the heart of Warsaw and it's this classy European city, and then they show it at the end of the war. They show the exact same neighborhood, only it has just one house left standing, and the rest is just ruins. That's what it looked like.

—

According to sociologist Martin Shaw, the comparison to the Warsaw Ghetto used to be somewhat hyperbolic, but has become more accurate as a result of the Gaza war and genocide since October 2023. Rebecca Ruth Gould argues that the comparison "can become a means of resisting the genocide of the Palestinian people in Gaza".

=== Rest of the world ===
On 18 February 2024, the President of Brazil, Lula da Silva, was criticized by The Times of Israel for comparing the actions of Israel in the 2023 Gaza war to the Holocaust. In April 2025, Vanina Biasi, an Argentinian lawmaker of the far-left Workers' Party was indicted by Federal Judge Daniel Rafecas for her tweets referring to Israel as a "fascist" and "Nazi" state and describing the war as a "Holocaust".

In May 2023, Tunisian President Kais Saied said, "While Tunisians protected Jews during the Holocaust, today elderly women and children are being bombed in Gaza." Rabbi Pinchas Goldschmidt, president of the Conference of European Rabbis, said such remarks incited hate against Tunisian Jews.

In November 2025, during a youth conference in Munich, Queen Rania of Jordan compared Israel's dehumanization of Palestinians, including referencing to former Israeli Defence Minister Yoav Gallant's language towards Palestinians to Nazi Germany's dehumanization of Jews, stating:

Dehumanizing speech has served as the prelude to some of the worst chapters in human history. In the 1930s in this very city, the Nazi party called Jewish people vermin. In Rwanda, public radio broadcasts described the Tutsis as cockroaches. In Myanmar, nationalists compared the Rohingya to stray dogs. In the aftermath of the October 7 [Hamas] attacks [on southern Israel], when an Israeli official (Gallant) announced a complete siege on Gaza, he described the population as 'human animals.' He was operating from a time-tested playbook: Convince the public you are dealing with beasts, and violence becomes not just acceptable, but necessary.

==== Turkey ====
In April 2016, Turkish-born Swedish politician Mehmet Kaplan, who served as the Minister of Housing, was forced to resign after a video surfaced from 2009, where he said: "Israelis today treat Palestinians in a very similar way to how Jews were treated in Germany in the 1930s."

In July 2018, following the Israeli government's adoption of the Basic Law: Israel as the Nation-State of the Jewish People, Turkish president Recep Tayyip Erdoğan said the "spirit of Hitler" lives on in Israel, saying there was "no difference [exists] between Hitler's obsession with a pure race and the understanding that these ancient lands are just for the Jews". He also called Israel "the world's most Zionist, fascist, racist state". The statements were condemned by Israeli prime minister Benjamin Netanyahu, who described Erdoğan's rule as "a dark dictatorship" and stated that Erdoğan "is massacring Syrians and Kurds and has jailed tens of thousands of his own citizens".

==== United Kingdom ====
In the United Kingdom, then Member of Parliament for Bradford East, the Liberal Democrat politician David Ward was criticized after writing in the ceremonial Book of Remembrance in the Houses of Parliament on Holocaust Memorial Day 2013: "I am saddened that the Jews, who suffered unbelievable levels of persecution during the Holocaust, could within a few years of liberation from the death camps be inflicting atrocities on Palestinians in the new state of Israel and continue to do so on a daily basis in the West Bank and Gaza." He later said that "a huge operation out there" had distorted what he meant. As a result, the Liberal Democrats' leadership threatened Ward with formal disciplinary action over his comments.

Roger Waters of the British rock band Pink Floyd has repeatedly compared Israel to Nazi Germany. In a 2013 interview with CounterPunch, he accused "the Jewish lobby" of being very powerful in the United States and said, "There were many people that pretended that the oppression of the Jews was not going on. From 1933 until 1946. So this is not a new scenario. Except that this time it's the Palestinian People being murdered." In The Observer, American rabbi and writer Shmuley Boteach said this comparison was antisemitic. In a 2017 hour-long video live chat on Facebook, Waters again compared Israel to Nazi Germany.

British-Australian Jewish actress Miriam Margolyes said that Israel's conduct in the Gaza war had made her more ashamed of the country: "it is as if Hitler has won – he has changed us Jews from being compassionate, caring and doing unto others as they'd do unto you into this vicious, genocidal and nationalist nation, pursuing and killing women and children." She said that while she "of course" condemned the October 7 attacks, Israel's actions in Gaza were nonetheless "shocking, embarrassing and wicked". In response, the Campaign Against Antisemitism called for her to be stripped of her OBE and BAFTA.

==== United States ====
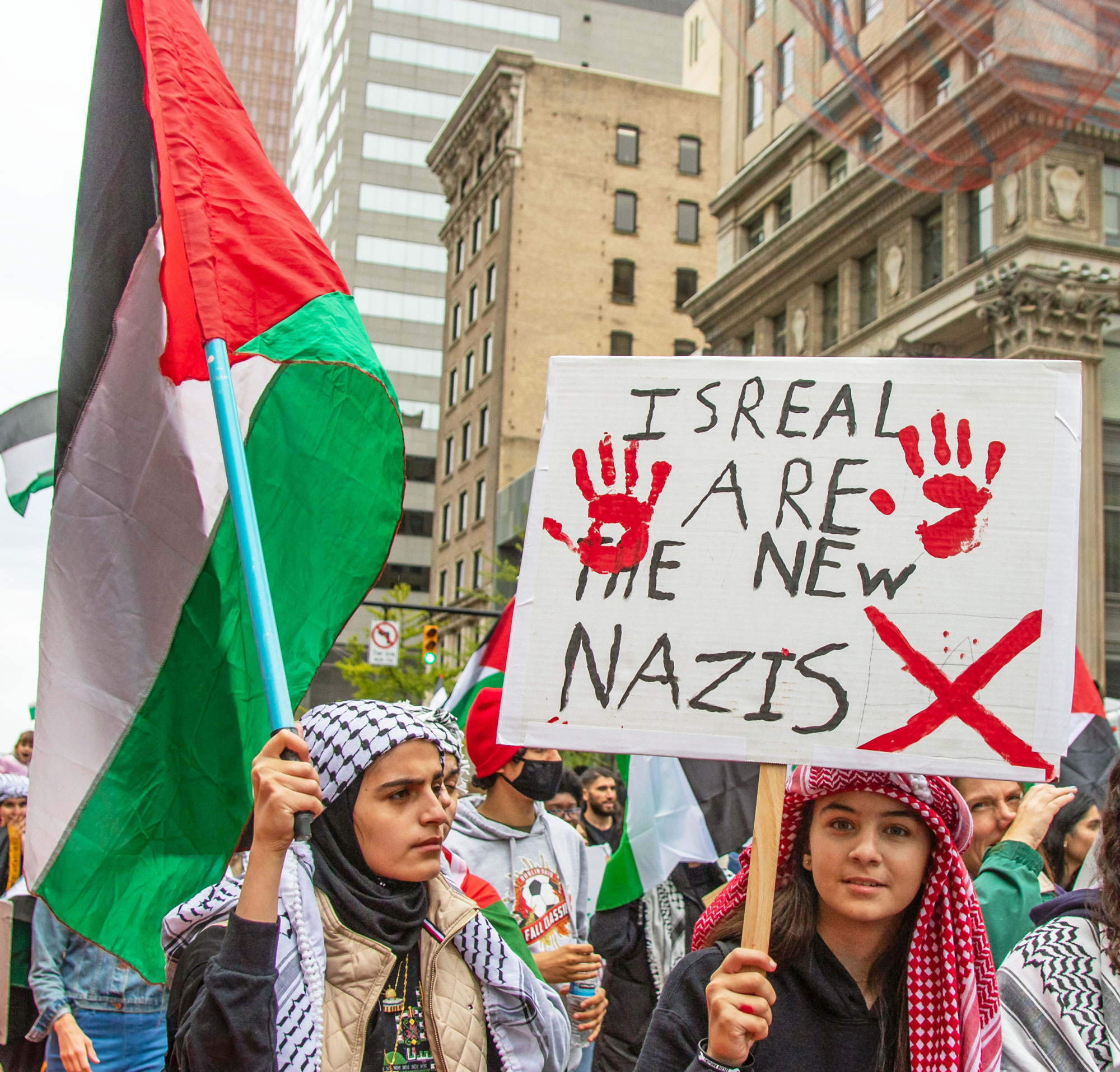
22 October 2023: Pro-Palestinian demonstrators in Columbus, Ohio, displaying a poster that reads "Isreal [sic] are the new Nazis" amidst Gaza war protests in the United States.

Jake Romm, in an article for Parapraxis on the role of the Holocaust in Zionism, wrote: "The Shoah [Holocaust] was present for the early Zionist perpetrators of the Nakba both as the crime to be avenged and the model for the barbarity—and efficacy—required to carry that vengeance out."

== Responses ==
Academics worldwide have debated whether comparisons between Israel and Nazi Germany are inherently antisemitic or not. Lesley Klaff and Bernard-Henri Lévy argue that comparing Israel to the Nazis lacks historical and moral equivalence, and risks inciting anti-Jewish sentiment. Historian Bernard Lewis suggests that the belief that the Nazis were no worse than Israel also provides "welcome relief to many who had long borne a burden of guilt for the role which they, their families, their nations, or their churches had played in Hitler's crimes against the Jews, whether by participation or complicity, acquiescence or indifference".

The Working Definition of Antisemitism – adopted by the International Holocaust Remembrance Alliance, the U.S. Department of State, and other organizations – offers several examples to help determine when criticism of Israel may be antisemitic, including "drawing comparison of contemporary Israeli policy to that of the Nazis". Critics of the definition say that it equates legitimate criticisms of Israel with antisemitism and that it has been used to censor pro-Palestinian activism, in particular. Journalist M. Gessen has also noted "One could also argue that the inherent conflation of Jews with the state of Israel is antisemitic, even that it meets the I.H.R.A. definition of antisemitism." Alternative definitions such as the Jerusalem Declaration on Antisemitism have been proposed instead on this basis.

According to political scientist Ian Lustick, a professor at the University of Pennsylvania, such comparisons are "a natural if unintended consequence of the immersion of Israeli Jews in Holocaust imagery". British scholar David Feldman suggests that comparisons in relation to the 2014 Gaza War were not motivated by a broader anti-Jewish subjectivity but by targeted criticism of Israeli policy in military actions.

In Austria, while overt antisemitism has been limited following the Holocaust, the Freedom Party of Austria has used comparisons between Nazi Germany and Israel to delegitimize its political opponents. In Israel, Lustick reports that many Israelis are "already repelled by actions against Palestinians they cannot help but associate with Nazi persecution of Jews". Israeli-American historian Omer Bartov has drawn an analogy between the German army's dehumanization of its enemies under Nazism and the attitudes displayed by young Israeli soldiers in the 2023 Gaza war.

=== Debate on antisemitic nature of the comparisons ===
Comparisons between Israel and Nazi Germany have been described as a form of Holocaust trivialization called Holocaust inversion. Author Yossi Klein Halevi said the comparison was a form of Holocaust conversion based on the dehumanizing trope of "the Jew as embodiment of evil", now transferred to "the satanic Jewish state". Halevi said "the Jew-as-Nazi is the endpoint of political supersessionism", in which Jews assume "the identity of our worst enemy".

Deborah Lipstadt, the U.S. Special Envoy for Combating Antisemitism, says Holocaust inversion is a "soft-core" form of Holocaust denial, as contrasted with the "hard-core" denial practiced by David Irving, which "dilutes what the Holocaust was" by using a false comparison. Kenneth L. Marcus says it aims to "shock, silence, threaten" Jews who support Israel, and "insulate, and legitimize" antisemitism, because it implies the subject deserves some form of punishment and they can disguise it as criticism of Israel instead.

Eyal Levin suggests that Holocaust inversion is becoming part of the iconography of a new antisemitism which has spread globally – particularly in the Arab and Muslim world and in Western Europe and America – often appearing in demonstrations and media portrayals. Bernard-Henri Lévy says this erodes societal safeguards by providing "an entirely new way of justifying" antisemitism that is subtler than yelling "Money Jews" or "They Killed Christ".

Author Ian Buruma opines that some critics of Israel misuse Holocaust imagery to cast Jews as perpetrators akin to Nazis. He argues that this rhetorical move is often made too self-righteously and may serve to ease lingering guilt over Jewish victimhood by portraying Jews as their own murderers.

Some scholars argue that invoking the Holocaust to criticize Israeli policies is not necessarily antisemitic or trivializing, but can instead challenge the misuse of Holocaust memory to justify contemporary state violence. Genocide studies scholar Raz Segal contends that Israeli leaders have long "weaponized" Holocaust rhetoric by comparing Palestinian groups to Nazis in order to present military actions as existential struggles against evil, thereby obscuring the asymmetry of power and erasing the historical context of Israeli settler-colonialism. He argues that such use of Holocaust memory distorts its legacy, employing it not to protect vulnerable populations but to justify violence against them. Segal maintains that meaningful engagement with Holocaust remembrance must include a commitment to truth, justice, and the protection of all civilians, including Palestinians.

Similarly, Holocaust historian Enzo Traverso warns that using the Holocaust to legitimize what he describes as a "genocidal war" in Gaza risks distorting its historical meaning and contributing to a "spectacular resurgence" of antisemitism, stating that "If in the name of the memory of the Holocaust we justify and support a genocide, that memory will be disqualified. And that will create misunderstandings and a new form of anti-Semitism. That memory had a meaning: it confirmed the extreme consequences of racism and after that genocide we cannot accept any form of exclusion, discrimination, persecution, oppression. With that conclusion, the memory of other genocides was built. If the memory of the Holocaust means supporting Israeli policy, all our references collapse." According to Marianne Hirsch, the refusal to see the relationships and make analogies between different histories of genocide, victimization, othering, or inequality in dangerous because arguments of exceptionalism can obscure other histories, as Hirsch argues Holocaust exceptionalism has done to the genocide in Gaza.

=== Polls and surveys ===
In 2021, a survey conducted by Bertelsmann Stiftung, an independent foundation in Germany, found that 36% of the 1,270 Germans that had been surveyed either "agreed or strongly agreed" that Israel's treatment against the Palestinians is the same as how the Jews were treated in Nazi Germany, based on the statement, "What the State of Israel is doing to the Palestinians today is in principle no different than what the Nazis in the Third Reich did to the Jews."

In January 2023, a survey conducted by the Anti-Defamation League found that 40% of Americans at least "slightly agreed" with the statement that "Israel treats Palestinians like Nazis treated Jews".

== See also ==
- Nazi analogies
- 3D test of antisemitism
- The Holocaust and the Nakba
- The Other Side: The Secret Relationship Between Nazism and Zionism

== Bibliography ==
- Bartov, Omer (2018). "National Narratives of Suffering and Victimhood: Methods and Ethics of Telling the Past as Personal Political History". The Holocaust and the Nakba. Columbia University Press. ISBN 978-0-231-54448-1.
- Lustick, Ian S. (2019). Paradigm Lost: From Two-State Solution to One-State Reality. University of Pennsylvania Press. ISBN 978-0-8122-5195-1.
- Rosenfeld, Alvin H. (9 January 2019). Anti-Zionism and Antisemitism: The Dynamics of Delegitimization. Indiana University Press. ISBN 978-0-253-03872-2.
- Marcus, Kenneth L. (30 August 2010). Jewish Identity and Civil Rights in America. Cambridge University Press. ISBN 978-1-139-49119-8.
- Steir-Livny, Liat (2019). "'Kristallnacht in Tel Aviv': Nazi Associations in the Contemporary Israeli Socio-Political Debate". New Perspectives on Kristallnacht: After 80 Years, the Nazi Pogrom in Global Comparison. Purdue University Press. ISBN 978-1-61249-616-0.
