= Transfer agreement =

A or the "transfer agreement" can refer to:

- Material transfer agreement, contract governing the transfer of tangible research materials
- Copyright transfer agreement, contract for the conveyance of full or partial copyright
- Haavara Agreement, 1933 agreement between Nazi Germany and Zionist German Jews concerning emigration
- The Transfer Agreement, book by Edwin Black about the Haavara Agreement
