= Charu Lata Hogg =

Sri Lankan activist

Chair of Sri Lanka Campaign for Peace and Justice
- Incumbent
- Assumed office September 2015
- Preceded by: Edward Mortimer

Executive Director, All Survivors Project
- Incumbent
- Assumed office 2018

Personal details
- Education: Delhi University, London School of Economics

Charu Lata Hogg is the chair of the Sri Lanka Campaign for Peace and Justice, executive director of All Survivors Project and associate fellow of the Asia-Pacific Programme in Chatham House. She was South Asia researcher for Human Rights Watch and documented human rights violations in Sri Lanka and Nepal. She was earlier a journalist writing for the Times of India, Far Eastern Economic Review, BBC Asia, South China Morning Post among others. She did her bachelor's degree in Hindu College, Delhi of Delhi University and her master's degree in International relations and affairs from the London School of Economics.
