= Fred Carver =

English researcher

Campaign Director of Sri Lanka Campaign for Peace and Justice
- In office 2011–2016

Camden Borough Councillor for Cantelowes (ward)
- In office 2006–2010

Personal details
- Born: Frédéric Hugh Carver
- Education: University College London, SOAS University of London, King's College London
- Website: Personal Website

Fred Carver is a researcher and an expert in the field of international relations with specific expertise on the United Nations, Peacekeeping, Human rights, Atrocity Prevention, civil wars and political violence. He was the Head of Policy in the United Nations Association – UK till 2020. He was first Campaign Director of Sri Lanka Campaign for Peace and Justice from 2011 to 2016. He earlier did consultancy work in Human Rights Watch. He was the youngest Councilor in the history of the London Borough of Camden when he was elected to the Cantelowes (ward) in 2006. He was a Campaign manager for the Liberal Democrats but he later he left the party. He has done his Master's in Asian Politics from SOAS University of London.
