= Jewish Bakers' Voice =

- Type: weekly newspaper
- Language: Yiddish; English
- Country: United States

The Jewish Bakers' Voice (in Yiddish: Idishe Bekers Shtime) was a trade paper for Jewish bakers published from New York City, the United States. It was printed in English and Yiddish. It was issued weekly on Fridays. According to the Ayer Directory of Publication of 1952 it was founded in 1916, whilst a 1948 issue of Industrial Marketing states that the publication began in 1927. The publication was issued by the Jewish Bakers' Voice, Inc. It was linked to the New York City Local 338 of the International Bagel Bakers Union. The offices of Jewish Bakers' Voice were located on 320 Broadway.

In 1934 Jewish Bakers' Voice was brought to the Brooklyn Supreme Court in a 450,000 USD damage suit by the Certified Yeast Company. The Jewish Bakers' Voice had accused the Certified Yeast Company (a Jewish-owned business) of having imported German yeast under a false name (in breach of the Jewish boycott of German goods). As of 1952 Morris Nagourney was the editor of the publication. At this point it had a circulation of 1,439 copies.
