= Lenni Brenner =

American Trotskyist writer (born 1937)

Lenni Brenner (born 1937), formerly known as Leonard Glaser or Lenny Glaser, (Note: Brenner went by this name in the 1960s. The name Glaser was that of his stepfather (Rorabaugh 1989, pp. 129–130; Rossman 2002, pp. 210–211).) is an American writer and activist. He was active in the 1960s as a prominent US civil rights activist as well as a vocal opponent of the Vietnam War. Since the 1980s, his activism has focused on anti-Zionism. He has published books on multiple subjects, including widely on the history of Zionism, in particular asserting that the movement collaborated with the Nazis.

== Early life ==
Brenner was born into an Orthodox Jewish family in 1937. He says he developed an early interest in history from reading Hendrik Willem van Loon's The Story of Mankind at age seven, which his brother had received as a bar mitzvah present. He had no interest in Jewish issues until around 1973, since, Brenner has remarked, he hailed from a milieu that frequented the synagogue only until the bar mitzvah rite was completed. (Note: "I didn't come from that tradition of being invested in Jewish issues or Israel. I came from the tradition that slammed the door on the synagogue after bar mitzvah time and walked off into America." (Brenner 2004a))

== Political activity ==
Brenner has recounted that his involvement with the civil rights movement began when he met James Farmer of the Congress of Racial Equality, later the organizer of the Freedom Rides of the early 1960s. He also worked with Bayard Rustin, later the organizer of Martin Luther King Jr.'s 1963 March on Washington for Jobs and Freedom. Brenner was arrested three times during civil rights sit-ins in the San Francisco Bay Area, In an article in the San Francisco Examiner Brenner, together with Mike Myerson, was identified as a member of the W.E.B. Du Bois youth wing of the Communist Party of the United States (CPUSA) within the Ad Hoc Committee to End Discrimination (AHCED).

=== Berkeley 1964, arrest and imprisonment ===
Brenner, then known as Glaser, came to University of California, Berkeley, in 1962. A bid to enroll in the orthodox Trotskyist Socialist Workers Party was rejected though he was permitted to join its youth branch, from which he was expelled for ignoring an order that he desist from talking about drug reform at street rallies. In February 1964, he was arrested on a drug charge and put on probation for marijuana possession. (Note: "In 1963, I was found guilty in Berkeley of possession of a 'roach', a butt of a marijuana cigarette, maybe 1/2 inch in length. Possession then carried 1 to 10 in the penitentiary, but I was granted 3 years street probation." (Brenner 2004b); the version given by his friend Michael Klein runs:"he was arrested for possession of marijuana. Last year he was picked up by the police while he was high on a legal cough medicine. He was taken to Alta Bates Community Hospital, where one of the doctors pronounced him legally intoxicated. The police officer then took him, semi-conscious, into another room of the hospital, searched him, and found part of a joint in one of his pants pockets."(Klein 1965))

Though a non-student, Brenner had become by this time a long-time campus orator, where he delivered passionate tirades to passing students while protesting issues like Kennedy's handling of the Cuban Missile Crisis and the papal opposition to birth control, while also advocating for the legalization of marijuana. On the missile crisis he once delivered a non-stop speech from noon to midnight at Bancroft and Telegraph Avenue in 1962. (Note: Davidson writes of a dark-haired, someone "cute" boy in his ragged beatnik way sounding off against Kennedy and the crisis (Davidson 1997, p. 37).) That venue was not thought to be on University property. (Note: "For several years student activists had made use of a strip of sidewalk along Bancroft Way, the southern boundary of the campus, where it was intersected by the heavily traveled Telegraph Avenue. At this busiest of all Berkeley intersections the activists set up tables, gave speeches, dispensed 'literature,' collected money, recruited members, and, in short, tried to involve passersby in one worthy cause or another. This section of sidewalk belonged to the university, not the city of Berkeley, though many administrators and students did not know it. Therefore, the activity on the strip violated the Kerr Directives. Until the summer of 1964, however, no one seemed to notice or to mind." (Hijiya 1988, p. 50).) The UC, under Chancellor Clark Kerr, who believed Communist influence lay behind the Free Speech Movement (FSM), had recently banned political activities on campus, and speakers were obliged to address passers-by outside, on city-owned property, though card-tables with leaflets were permitted a few steps inside. On September 14, 1964, the university administration extended its ban, in effect from the 21st., to these card tables on the 26 foot brick walkway, technically also University property, just outside the campus entrance. The tightening of this regulation triggered a wave of defiance, with students challenging the order by moving the card-tables inside the campus grounds.

On October 1, 1964, Jack Weinberg a student of mathematics who had graduated with great distinction, challenged the ruling by setting up one such card table in Sproul Plaza. He was collecting funds for Congress of Racial Equality(CORE): a number of campus activists at the time, including philosophy student Mario Savio, were spending their summers aiding the civil rights movement to get Afro-Americans to register for a vote in the face of Ku Klux Klan violence.

After Weinberg refused to identify himself to emissaries of the dean, a lieutenant from the campus police was called in and informed him of the infraction. Outnumbered, the policeman then left and came back with three more officers who arrested Weinberg for trespass and for violating the regulation against political activity. Weinberg, using a passive disobedience technique, went limp and had to be hauled to a police car, which was almost immediately encircled by hundreds of students. Brenner, In what has been described as an "historic event," (Note: Lewis Feuer. (Feuer 1969, p. 434, Wood 1980, p. 184)) is generally reported (Note: According to Sara Davidson, the first to throw themselves in front of the car were Jeff Berman and his girlfriend Susie Hersh. James Wood, an eye-witness correcting Davidson's account, states that the first under the car was "clearly Glaser". The whole incident was filmed by Ursula Cadalbert, and, though the only copy was subsequently mislaid in the mail, one faculty member who had viewed it said Brenner initiated the blocking of the police car by sliding under it.) to have been the first in the crowd to try and physically block the exit of the police vehicle detaining Weinberg by rolling under it. Several hundred (Note: Jo Freeman, who was present, writes of thousands. (Freeman 2004, p. 153) The sociologist Seymour Lipset, in a follow-up study set the precise figure of those who captured the police car at 600.) joined him and the car remained "entrapped" for 32 hours. In response, 643 police were assembled on the campus by 2 October. The hood of the car was turned into a platform where Savio, and one source claims Brenner himself, (Note: Brenner is not listed by Freeman as a speaker from the car roof. She noted in this function, in addition to Savio, Charlie Powell, Bettina Aptheker, Jackie Goldberg, Dusty Miller, Jack Weinberg, a Father Fisher from Newman College, and Art Goldberg (Freeman 2004, pp. 159, 160, 169).) made speeches and Joan Baez sang before a growing student crowd of thousands.

Brenner, though present, later stated he was opposed to the ensuing demonstration, and that he had approached the car and asked Weinberg if he wanted to get out. Weinberg replied negatively saying that his presence there was of symbolic value. The university authorities regarded Brenner as a trouble-maker. Some days after the incident, the university police contacted Brenner's probation officer expressing concern that his exceptional rhetorical talents might induce "mob action or violence" on the campus. According to David Goines, Brenner was then arrested when a policemen observed him accepting a beer from a passer-by and charged him with drinking in public. (Note: Michael Klein states that the main charge against him was that he advocated the removal of Jack Weinberg from the police car (Klein 1965).) This charge signified legally that he had violated the terms of his three-year probation. (Note: Goines himself, when the police car had been captured, flattened the police car by letting the air out of 3 tyres (Freeman 2004, p. 156))

Lewis Feuer frequently referred to Brenner (Glaser) as the nihilistic Nechayev of the FSM, the evil genius behind the movement. The UC sent a representative to testify against Brenner's probation while Brenner was denied the right to call witnesses on his own behalf. The court ruling revoked his probation on the grounds that he had obstructed police in the execution of their duties. He was sentenced to 1 to 10 years' imprisonment. Brenner's appeal against his conviction was turned down by Judge Richard Sims who however, according to Brenner, wrote that he was troubled by Judge Dieden's ruling. For Sims, Brenner was not a felon. If he were mentally ill, referral to an appropriate institution would have been proper. Were he a trespassing social malcontent, he should have been judged for a normal misdemeanour.

UC faculty scholar William Petersen wrote an extensive report on the incident which, on 17 May 1965, was read into a Senate inquiry into putative Communist influence on American universities into internal security laws. In it Petersen described Brenner as a convicted narcotics user who assaulted police. Brenner subsequently spent 39 months in jail at California Men's Colony. In the Oakland lockup, while waiting to be sent to the state penitentiary, he met and had intense discussions with Huey Newton. He recalls that his time in prison enabled him to read widely in the library, enjoy free medical care, and engage with some of the "most impressive & intelligent people" he encountered in the 60s decade.

Brenner was released on January 22, 1968, after serving a term of 3 years and 3 months. In a memoir of the period, one of the FSM leaders, Michael Rossman argued that the movement, in failing to stand by Brenner when he was targeted by the authorities, had effectively betrayed him and his distinctive campus voice.

== Later activism ==
He was an anti-war activist during the Vietnam War.

In 1968 he co-founded the National Association for Irish Justice, the American affiliate of the Northern Ireland Civil Rights Association.

In the 1990s, he and the Black Power leader Kwame Ture (aka Stokely Carmichael) co-founded a Committee against Zionism and Racism. They also published The Anti-War Activist.

In the early 2000s, he became active in endeavouring to organize a Coalition for Narcotic Law Reform in the US.

Brenner spoke at an Israeli Apartheid Week event in 2011 at Berlin, Connecticut.

== Writing ==
His books have been widely translated and reviewed in 11 languages. His books have been reviewed in the London Times, the London Review of Books, Booklist magazine, and the Washington Report on Middle East Affairs.

His articles have also appeared in publications related to the Middle East and identifying with the political left, including The Nation, Amsterdam News, (Note: "Brenner also writes frequently for the Amsterdam News, a New York publication targeted to African Americans. This paper, which promotes the antiSemitic Rev. Al Sharpton, and defends the anti-Semitic CCNY professor Leonard Jeffries, used Brenner to diminish the claim that there is any serious anti-Semitism in the United States today." (Stern 1993, p. 172, n.129)) Atlanta Constitution, Washington Report on Middle East Affairs, Middle East Policy, Journal of Palestine Studies, New Statesman, Al-Fajr and United Irishman.

The Institute for Historical Review, a Holocaust denial platform, has cited, promoted, and sold Brenner's work. Brenner has opposed his work being used by those on the far right, and those engaged in Holocaust denial. Antisemitism scholar Kenneth S. Stern has described Brenner as antisemitic. (Note: "Holocaust denial on the Far left also expresses itself in another way. Lenni Brenner, himself a Jew, is anti-Zionist and anti-Semitic. 'Just as there were no good Nazis,' he said, 'there are no good Zionists.' Despite Brenner's left credentials, his writings have been promoted and sold by the IHR." (Stern 1993, p. 56)) Brenner says that since he is Jewish, rather than being called an "anti-Semite", he is often called a "self-hating Jew". (Note: "Since I'm ethnically a Jew, Zionists don't call me an anti-Semite. Instead I'm a 'self-hating Jew.' But I've made a joke out of the charge. When I lecture, I cite the accusation and then tell how my 42 million ex-girlfriends insist that 'The Zionists don't know what they are talking about. Lenni Brenner is definitely not a self-hating Jew. Lenni is in love with himself. The only one he ever loved is himself!' My audiences always roar with laughter." (Brenner 2014))

Anti-Zionist activist Uri Davis positively reviewed both Zionism in the Age of the Dictators (1983) and The Iron Wall (1984) for Race and Class. He said that both works contained invaluable information and documentation, but had uneven quality. In Davis's view, the former book was an important "work informed by the moral and the political insight of the author as an anti-Zionist scholar". Davis found the thrust of the latter study, despite its impeccable documentation, somewhat weakened by passages of "pseudo-Freudian causal explanations" that Brenner wrote to supplement his political analysis. Secondly Davis says that Brenner makes "repeated irresponsible political statements verging on the nonsensensical", such as Brenner's notion that, were it not for the presence of the British army, the tiny Zionist yishuv would have been driven into the sea.

In 2016, British socialist politician Ken Livingstone praised Brenner's book Zionism in the Age of the Dictators while defending comments he made about Adolf Hitler which were widely considered antisemitic, helping to spark a controversy about Antisemitism in the UK Labour Party. Historian of Nazi Germany Michael Burleigh said that Brenner and Livingstone "strain[ed] the objectively episodic and marginal into something maliciously significant".

== Bibliography ==
Brenner has authored, co-authored and edited a number of books:

- Zionism in the Age of the Dictators – which argued that many Zionist leaders collaborated with fascism, particularly Nazi Germany in order to build up the Jewish presence in Palestine. First printed in 1983, reprinted in 2014. It has been translated into Japanese: Fuashizumu jidai no shionizumu, by Shiba Kensuke (芝健介), Hōsei Daigaku 2001, German (in a revised edition), as Zionismus und Faschismus: über die unheimliche Zusammenarbeit von Zionisten und Faschisten, tr. Verena Gajewski Homilius, Kai, Berlin 2007, and Spanish as Sionismo y Fascismo, by Luis César Bou, Bósforo Libros, Madrid, 2010.
- The Iron Wall: Zionist Revisionism from Jabotinsky to Shamir, first published in 1984 by Zed Books, London.
- Jews in America Today
- The Lesser Evil (1988) – a study of the United States Democratic Party
- 51 Documents: Zionist Collaboration with the Nazis (2002) Barricade Books – This book has been translated to Spanish by Luis César Bou as 51 Documentos Sobre la Colaboración Sionista con los Nazis Editorial Canaán, Buenos Aires, 2012. – translations of many of the documents quoted in Zionism in the Age of the Dictators and The Iron Wall
- Jefferson & Madison On Separation of Church and State: Writings on Religion and Secularism
- Black Liberation and Palestine Solidarity (2013)– a collection of selected essays that "discusses the historical response of African American freedom movements to the colonial settler state of Israel and its role in American Imperialism in the Middle East."

== Wider views ==
- Brenner is said to have read legal works extensively during his incarceration, and to have become contemptuous of law generally and the Supreme Court in particular (making an exception of the Fourth Chief Justice of the United States, John Marshall. In his view
  The wind blows a piece of paper into the law courts and it takes a yoke of oxen to get it out.
- In protesting the ban on marijuana use, Brenner framed his case in terms of the United States Constitution. The personal use of marijuana was a widespread, "trivial" and customary habit and, he argued, therefore was protected by the unenumerated rights alluded to in the 9th Amendment, according to which, "(t)he enumeration in the constitution of certain rights shall not be construed to deny or disparage others retained by the People."

== Sources ==
- Brenner, Lenni (ed.). "Reviews". Stopmebeforeivoteagain.org.
- Brenner, Lenni (2004). ""It's All Rabbis and No Jews": An Interview with Lenni Brenner". Palestine Solidarity Review (Interview). Archived from the original on September 21, 2015.
- Brenner, Lenni (October 26, 2004). "The 1964 Berkeley Free Speech Movement". CounterPunch.
- Brenner, Lenni (November 13, 2005). ""Next"..A Prison Tale". CounterPunch.
- Brenner, Lenni (October 18, 2014). "Lenni Brenner: An Interview on Palestine Solidarity, Black Liberation and Anti-Zionism" (Interview). Interviewed by Falcone, Dan. Truthout.
- Brenner, Lenni; Quest, Matthew (2013). Black Liberation and Palestine Solidarity. On Our Own Authority! Publishing. ISBN 978-0-985-89097-1.
- Burleigh, Michael (May 5, 2016). "History shows Hitler never was a Zionist". The Jewish Chronicle.
- "Civil rights activist at Sligo talk". Sligo. Irish Independent. March 2, 2005a.
- Cohen, Robert (September 2013). "J. Edgar and the Gipper on the Berkeley Barricades: Review". The Journal of American History. 41 (3): 545–556. JSTOR 43663462.
- Cummins, Eric (1994). The Rise and Fall of California's Radical Prison Movement. Stanford University Press. ISBN 978-0-804-72232-2.
- Davidson, Sara (1997). Loose Change: Three Women of the Sixties. University of California Press. ISBN 978-0-520-20910-7.
- Davis, Uri (July 1985). "Book review: Zionism in the Age of the Dictators: a reappraisal by Lenni Brenner, and The Iron Wall by Lenni Brenner". Race & Class. 27 (2): 91–96. doi:10.1177/030639688502700106. S2CID 144901468.
- Deutsch, Christopher Robert (Fall 2010). Against the Red Tide: Rename, Vale and the Long Red Scare in California (MA thesis). California State University, Sacramento.
- Feuer, Lewis (1969). The Conflict of Generations: the character and significance of student movements. Basic Books.
- Fox, Margalit (May 19, 2008). "Michael Rossman, Who Fought for Campus Rights, Dies at 68". The New York Times.
- Freeman, Jo (2004). At Berkeley in the Sixties: The Education of an Activist, 1961-1965. Indiana University Press. ISBN 978-0-253-21622-9.
- Garson, Marvin (January 26, 1968). "Lenny Glaser, "When travelling in a strange land, find out what is forbidden"". Vol. 1, no. 1. San Francisco Express Times. pp. 1, 3. JSTOR community.28043928.
- Goines, David (1993). The Free Speech Movement: Coming of Age in the 1960s. Ten Speed Press. ISBN 978-0-898-15535-8.
- Heirich, Max (1971). The Spiral of Conflict: Berkeley 1964. Columbia University Press. ISBN 978-0-231-08325-6.
- Hijiya, James A. (April 1988). "The Free Speech Movement and the Heroic Moment". Journal of American Studies. 22 (1): 43–65. doi:10.1017/S0021875800033004. JSTOR 27554937. S2CID 145728882.
- "Israeli Apartheid Week: A Year-by-Year Report" (PDF). Anti-Defamation League. 2012.
- Kennedy, Dominic (May 2, 2016). "Livingstone's guru was campus radical caught with drugs". The Times.
- Kennedy, Dominic (May 4, 2016). "I'll stand by Livingstone, says Zionism book author". The Times.
- Klein, Michael (May 1965). "The Case of Lenny Glaser". Spider magazine. Vol. 1, no. IV.
- Lipset, Seymour (1972). Rebellion in the University: A History of Student Activism in America. Routledge and Kegan Paul.
- Mortimer, Edward (February 11, 1984). "Contradiction, collusion and controversy". The Times. p. 14 – via Times Digital Archive.
- Petersen, William (1966). Faculty Rebellion at Berkeley. Hearings, Reports and Prints of the Senate Committee on the Judiciary. U.S. Government Printing Office. pp. 17–27.
- Quinn, Ben (April 29, 2016). "Ken Livingstone cites Marxist book in defence of Israel comments". The Guardian.
- Rorabaugh, W.J. (1989). Berkeley at War: The 1960s. Oxford University Press, USA. ISBN 978-0-198-02252-7.
- Rosenfeld, Seth (October 10, 2004). "Mario Savio's FBI Odyssey: The Man Who Challenged the " Machine" Rosenfeld+ the Man Who Challenged the Machine". San Francisco Chronicle.
- Rosenfeld, Seth (2012). Subversives: The FBI's War on Student Radicals, and Reagan's Rise to Power. Farrar, Straus and Giroux. ISBN 978-1-429-96932-1.
- Rossman, Michael (2002). ""The Rossman Report": A Memoir of Making History". In Cohen, Robert Cohen; Zelnik, Reginald E. (eds.). The Free Speech Movement: Reflections on Berkeley in the 1960s. University of California Press. pp. 189–214. ISBN 978-0-520-23354-6.
- Stern, Kenneth S. (1993). Holocaust Denial (PDF). American Jewish Committee.
- Stoetzler, Marcel (2019). "Capitalism, the nation and societal corrosion: notes on "left-wing antisemitism"". Journal of Social Justice. 9: 1–45.
- Wood, James L. (August 3, 1980). "Remembering the Free Speech Movement: Notes of an Observer". Sociological Focus. 13 (3): 179–186. JSTOR 20831159.
