= The Iron Wall: Zionist Revisionism from Jabotinsky to Shamir =

- Author: Lenni Brenner
- Publication date: 1984
- ISBN: 978-0862322175

The Iron Wall: Zionist Revisionism from Jabotinsky to Shamir is a 1984 book by the American Trotskyist Lenni Brenner. It is a highly critical account of the development of Revisionist Zionism. The name of the book is a reference to an essay written by Ze'ev Jabotinsky in 1923.

== Reception ==
Anti-Zionist activist Uri Davis wrote in Race and Class journal in 1985 that The Iron Wall suffered from "pseudo-Freudian causal explanations" and "repeated irresponsible political statements verging on the nonsensensical".
