= 51 Documents =

2002 book

51 Documents: Zionist Collaboration with the Nazis
- Author: Lenni Brenner
- Language: English
- Published: 2002
- Publication place: United States

51 Documents: Zionist Collaboration with the Nazis is a 2002 book by the American Trotskyist and anti-Zionist Lenni Brenner. The book presents 51 documents that Brenner argues show that Zionist leaders collaborated with fascism particularly in Nazi Germany in order to build up a Jewish presence in Palestine. The book continues themes explored in Brenner's earlier and highly controversial work Zionism in the Age of the Dictators.

The book is split into five sections:

- Zionism and anti-Semitism before Hitler
- The World Zionist Organization and Nazism Before the Holocaust
- Zionist Revisionism, Fascism, and Nazism Before the Holocaust
- The World Zionist Organization During the Holocaust
- The Stern Gang and the Nazis

== See also ==
- Zionist antisemitism
