= Francis R. Nicosia =

American historian (1944–2023)

- Born: October 29, 1944; Philadelphia, Pennsylvania, U.S.
- Died: November 21, 2023 (aged 79)

Academic background
- Education: Pennsylvania State University; Georgetown University; McGill University

Academic work
- Discipline: History
- Institutions: University of Vermont; Saint Michael's College

Francis R. Nicosia (October 29, 1944 – November 21, 2023) was an American historian at the University of Vermont with a focus on modern history and Holocaust research.

== Life ==
Francis R. Nicosia was born in Philadelphia on October 29, 1944. He worked for the Peace Corps in Libya in 1968/69. In Germany, he was employed in 1971/72 as a "Teacher Assistant" at the Peter Dörfler School in Marktoberdorf. He then studied history at Pennsylvania State University and Georgetown University and did his PhD in 1978 at McGill University in German History and Middle East History.

From 1979 to 2008, he was a professor of history at Saint Michael's College, Vermont, and was a professor of history and Holocaust studies at the University of Vermont from 2008 until his retirement in 2018. Nicosia had a research stay in 1992 as a Fulbright scholarship holder at Technische Universität Berlin and in 2006 at the Humboldt University of Berlin.

In addition to his monographs, he was co-editor of various works and also contributed to the Encyclopedia of the Middle East and the Encyclopedia of the Holocaust, published by the United States Holocaust Memorial Museum.

Nicosia died on November 21, 2023, at the age of 79.

== Reviews ==
=== Zionism and Anti-Semitism in Nazi Germany ===
Avinoam Patt in his review of Zionism and Anti-Semitism in Nazi Germany wrote "As Nicosia concludes, ultimately, there was absolutely no way in which they [Zionists and Nazi Germans] could actually "collaborate," for "in the end, the Nazis maintained a contempt for Zionism as for all things Jewish, as representative of what they considered to be some of the most dangerous and abhorrent characteristics of the Jews as a people... inseparable from the object of Nazi hatred and intent". In examining the inherently unequal relationship between these two nationalist movements, Nicosia has made an important contribution to both the history of Zionism and Nazism (and more broadly to the fields of German and Jewish history), while correcting misconceptions about the limits of actual Jewish and Zionist power."

Regarding the same work, Roderick Stackelberg writes "(Nicosia's) findings certainly confirm the crucial importance of antisemitism in the origins of the Holocaust, but they also point to war as the key to the radicalization of antisemitic measures to a policy of physical annihilation (as threatened by Hitler as early as his notorious Reichstag speech of January 1939) [...] Nicosia makes no references to the present, except to point out the irony that while anti-Zionism or criticism of the state of Israel in Europe or the United States today is often equated with antisemitism (or viewed as motivated by antisemitism), before 1933, antisemites (in Germany and Austria) were more likely to support Zionist aims than to oppose them. Until the Nazi policy of ethnic cleansing left Jews with no alternative to emigration, the most prominent critics of Zionism tended to be Jews who rejected the Zionist claim that Jews had a distinct ethnic or national (as opposed to cultural or religious) identity that made them aliens in the countries in which they lived."

=== Nazi Germany and the Arab World ===
David Motadel, reviewing Nazi Germany and the Arab World, writes "Nicosia's book can be read as a response to [...] recent publications—as a re-examination of Nazi Germany's foreign policy toward Arab lands from Marrakesh to Muscat. Reviving (and extending) his 1980 thesis, he argues that the strategic interests and ideological outlooks of the two sides differed significantly. Yet the book is more than just a response to the recent works in the field; it provides a thorough chronological account of the Third Reich's involvement in the Arab world."

== Works ==
- Nicosia, Francis R. (1985). The Third Reich and the Palestine Question. London: I. B. Tauris.
- Nicosia, Francis R.; Niewyk, Donald L. (2000). The Columbia Guide to the Holocaust. New York: Columbia University Press.
- Nicosia, Francis R.; Huener, Jonathan (2002). Medicine and Medical Ethics in Nazi Germany: Origins, Practices, Legacies. Berghahn Books.
- Nicosia, Francis R.; Huener, Jonathan (2004). Business and Industry in Nazi Germany. Berghahn Books.
- Huener, Jonathan; Nicosia, Francis R. (2006). The Arts in Nazi Germany: Continuity, Conformity, Change. Berghahn Books.
- Nicosia, Francis R. (2008). Zionism and Anti-Semitism in Nazi Germany. New York: Cambridge U.P.
- Nicosia, Francis R.; Scrase, David (2010). Jewish Life in Nazi Germany: Dilemmas and Responses. Berghahn Books.
- Nicosia, Francis R. (2014). Nazi Germany and the Arab World. New York: Cambridge U.P.
- Nicosia, Francis R.; Stokes, Lawrence D. (2015). Germans Against Nazism: Nonconformity, Opposition and Resistance in the Third Reich. Berghahn Books.
- Nicosia, Francis R.; Fraser, Russell (2017). The Three Romes: Moscow, Constantinople, and Rome. Routledge.
- Nicosia, Francis R. (2017). Nazism, the Holocaust, and the Middle East: Arab and Turkish Responses. Berghahn Books.
- Niewyk, Donald L.; Nicosia, Francis R. (2017). Race and Ethnicity in America: A Concise History.
