= Hilton Obenzinger =

American peace activist (born 1947)

- Born: 1947 (age 78–79); Brooklyn, New York City, U.S.
- Occupation: Poet

Academic background
- Education: Columbia College; Stanford University

Academic work
- Institutions: Stanford University School of Humanities and Sciences

Hilton Obenzinger (born 1947 in Brooklyn) is an American novelist, poet, history and criticism writer.

== Life ==
Obenzinger was born in Brooklyn in 1947, and raised in Queens. He graduated from Columbia University in 1969 and from Stanford University with a PhD in 1997. He was active in the Columbia University protests of 1968. He taught at the Yurok Indian reservation along the Klamath River in northern California, 1969–1970. He taught at Stanford University, where he is associate director of the Chinese Railroad Workers in North America Project.

== Awards ==
- 1982 American Book Award for This Passover or the next, I will never be in Jerusalem

== Bibliography ==
- Obenzinger, Hilton (2021). Witness: 2017-2020. Irene Weinberger Books. ISBN 9780990376798.
- Obenzinger, Hilton (2017). Treyf Pesach. Ithuriel's Spear. ISBN 978-1-943209-16-3.
- Obenzinger, Hilton (2015). How We Write: The Varieties of Writing Experience. Createspace. ISBN 9781517152604.
- Obenzinger, Hilton (2008). Busy Dying. Chax Press. ISBN 978-0-925904-73-7.
- Obenzinger, Hilton (2004). A*Hole. Soft Skull Press. ISBN 978-1-932360-46-2.
- Zosia Goldberg (2004). Hilton Obenzinger (ed.). Running Through Fire: How I Survived the Holocaust. Mercury House. ISBN 978-1-56279-128-5.
- Obenzinger, Hilton (1999). American Palestine: Melville, Twain and the Holy Land Mania. Princeton University Press. ISBN 978-0-691-00973-5.
- Obenzinger, Hilton (1993). Cannibal Eliot and the Lost Histories of San Francisco. Mercury House. ISBN 978-1-56279-047-9.
- Obenzinger, Hilton (October 1989). New York on Fire. Real Comet Press. ISBN 9780941104401.
- Obenzinger, Hilton (1980). This Passover Or The Next I Will Never Be in Jerusalem. Momo's Press. ISBN 978-0-917672-12-5.
- Obenzinger, Hilton (1974). Bright Lights! Big City! (early Poems). Adventures in Poetry.
