= Fifth Aliyah =

Wave of Jewish immigration to the Palestine region

The Fifth Aliyah (Hebrew: העלייה החמישית, romanized: HaAliyah HaHamishit) refers to the fifth wave of the Jewish immigration to Mandatory Palestine from Europe and Asia between the years 1929 and 1939, with the arrival of 225,000 to 300,000 Jews. The Fifth Aliyah, or fifth immigration wave, began after the comeback from the 1927 economic crisis in Mandatory Palestine and the 1929 Palestine riots, during the period of the Fourth Aliyah.

This wave of immigration began as a pioneering one, but with the onset of racial persecution in Nazi Germany attained the character of a mass migration between 1933 and 1939, with at least 55,000 Jews from Central Europe immigrating to Palestine or residing there as semi-permanent residents. The 1936–1939 Arab riots in Mandatory Palestine weakened the immigration wave, but during the years 1938–1939 thousands of Jewish immigrants arrived, some of them illegally. The British White Paper of 1939 severely curtailed Jewish immigration. The onset of World War II a few months later also inhibited immigration to Mandatory Palestine.

== The causes for the immigration ==
- The rise to power of Hitler and the Nazi Party caused enormous disruption to the lives of Jews in Germany and Eastern Europe. As Nazi persecution tightened its grip on the Jewish population, many who wished to leave Germany were prevented by the immigration laws of the Third Reich, forcing them to stay and suffer from the huge wave of overt antisemitism sweeping the country. In an attempt to ameliorate this problem, the Jewish agency and the Nazi authorities reached in August 1933 a transfer agreement, in Hebrew heskem ha'avara, stipulating that Jews leaving Germany be reimbursed for their assets, even though German law at the time required them to give up their assets in order to leave. These provisions were combined with an allowance for the importation of German merchandise to Palestine. While not destined to be a permanent arrangement, the Haavara Agreement served interests on both sides of the dispute and helped facilitate continued Jewish immigration to the region.
- The exchange of the British colonial administrator – the new British colonial administrator, Arthur Wauchope, was pro-Zionist, granting many immigration permits and encouraging the Jewish economy and Zionist settlement.
- The economic growth in Palestine – the transmission agreement with Germany bringing large amounts of money was a starting point to the recovery of the Jewish economy in Palestine after the crisis of the late 1920s.
- The closing of gates to the United States – with the 1921 Emergency Quota Act and the subsequent Immigration Act of 1924, the United States severely restricted immigration, and even during the period of the Fifth Aliyah the US kept its gates closed to the majority of immigrants, despite the persecution of the Jews in Europe.
- Anti-semitism in the world prevailed – many more regimes in mainly European countries adopted a policy of anti-semitism which encouraged riots, persecution and the economic and social limitations on Jews.

== Gallery ==
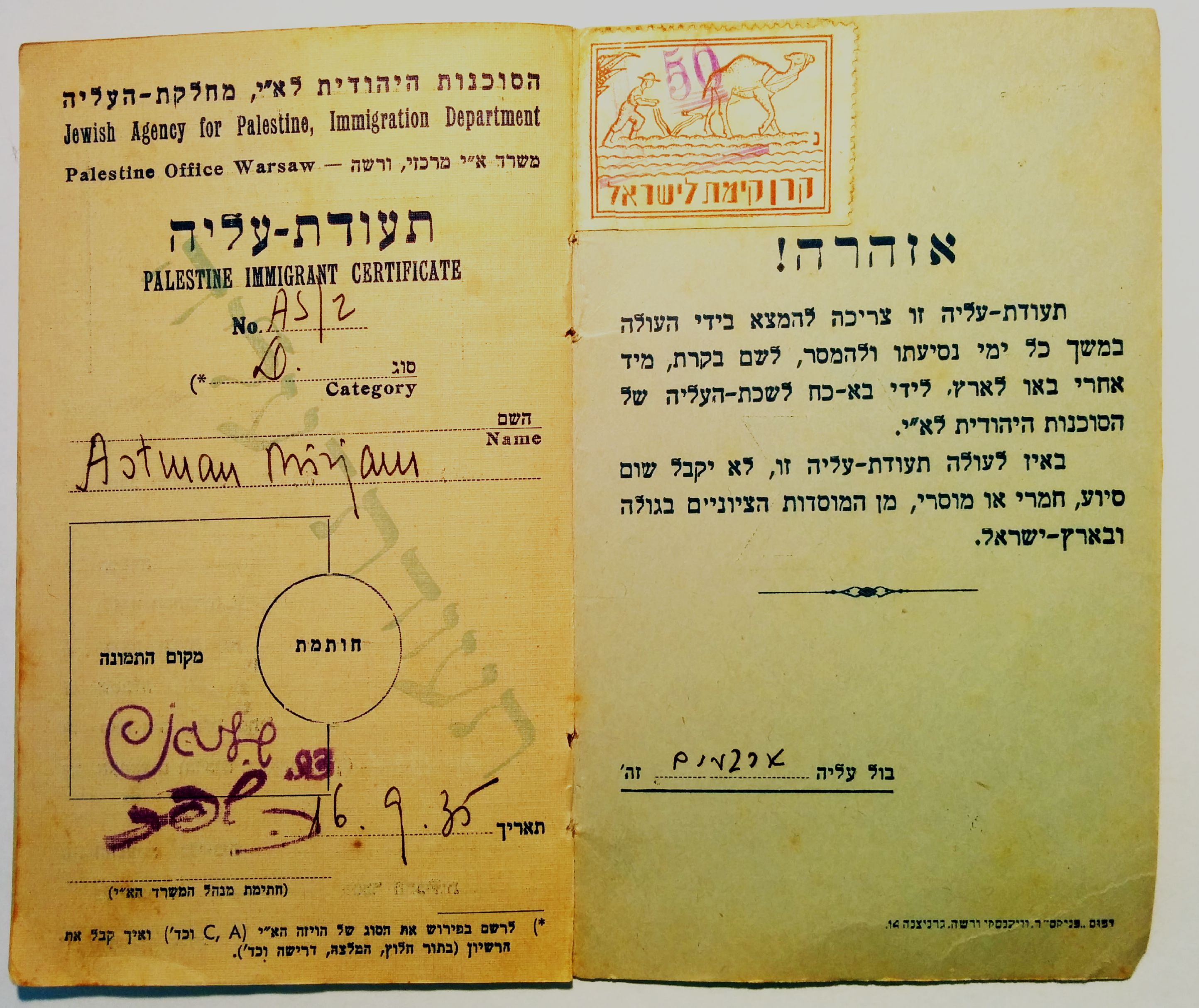
Palestine immigrant certificate issued in Warsaw (16-9-1935) by the Jewish Agency

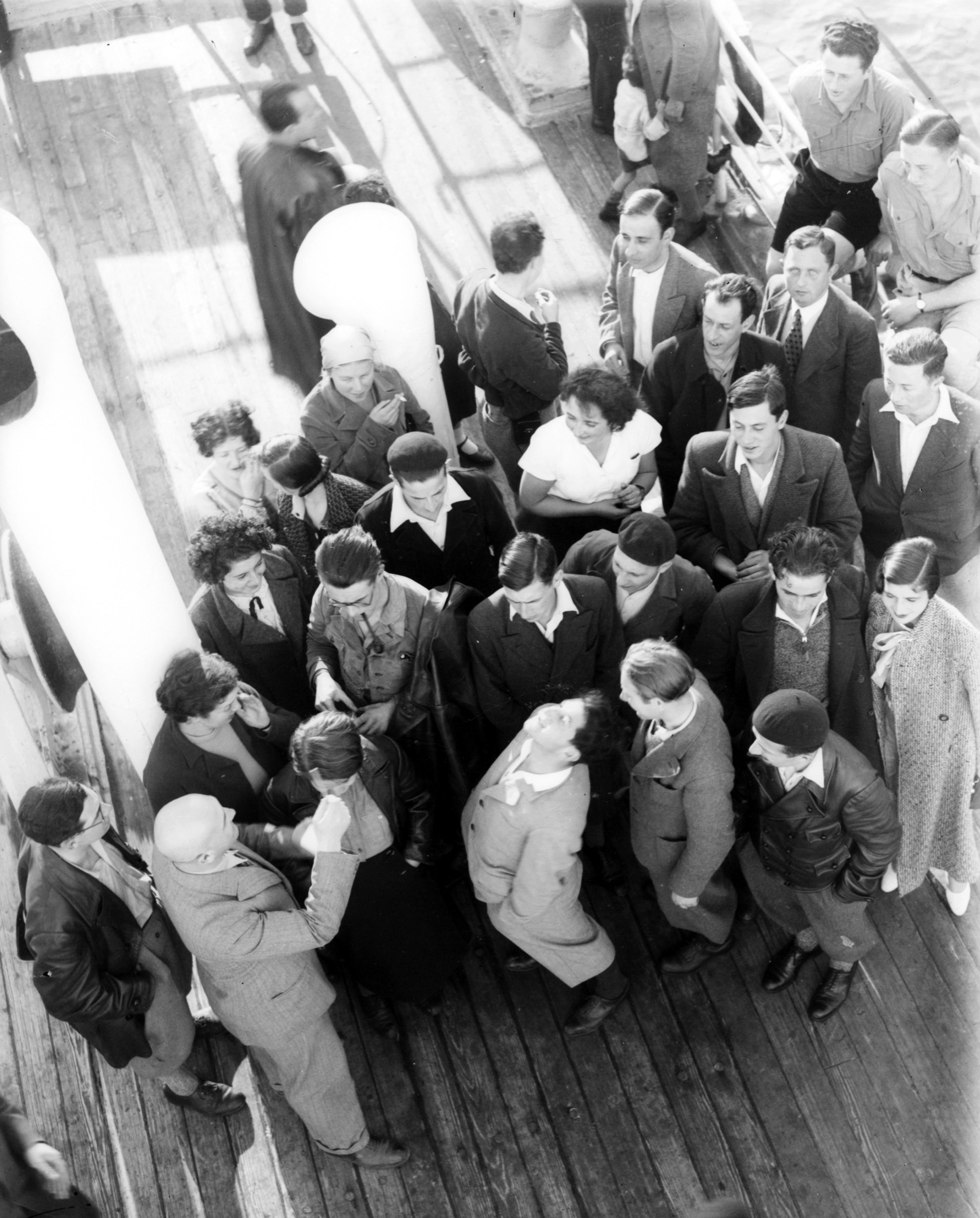
Immigrants from Germany arriving at the port of Jaffa in 1933

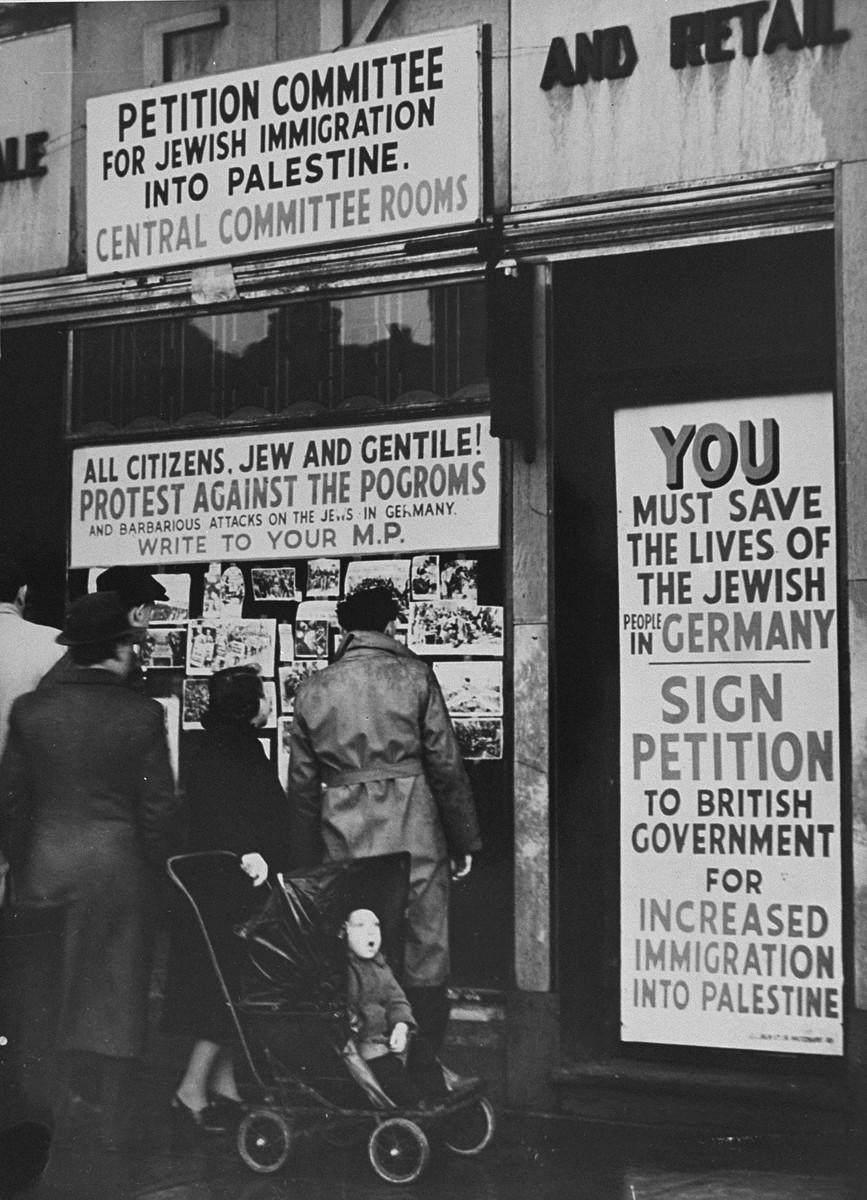
British Jews protest against immigration restrictions to Mandatory Palestine after Kristallnacht, November 1938
