= Lewis Samuel Feuer =

American sociologist (1912–2002)

- Born: December 7, 1912; Manhattan, New York
- Died: November 24, 2002 (aged 89); Newton, Massachusetts

Academic background
- Education: City College of New York; Harvard University

Academic work
- Discipline: Sociology
- Institutions: Vassar College; University of California, Berkeley; University of Toronto; University of Virginia

Lewis Samuel Feuer (December 7, 1912 – November 24, 2002) was an American sociologist. Initially a committed Marxist, he became a neo-conservative.

== Life ==
Feuer was born in Manhattan, grew up on the Lower East Side, and attended DeWitt Clinton High school. He graduated from City College with distinction in 1931, and was awarded a Ph.D. at Harvard University in 1935. for a dissertation in philosophy entitled "The philosophical analysis of space and time", supervised by Alfred North Whitehead. While at Harvard, Feuer joined Paul and Alan Sweezy in founding the Harvard Teachers Union. This represents one obvious example of his persistent involvement in radical politics throughout the 1930s. During World War II, he served as a liaison between the American and French Armies on New Caledonia, where he was demoted for attempting to organize the indentured Indochinese and Indonesian coolie laborers who were being used to build an airstrip for the Free French forces.

After World War II he taught at Vassar College and the University of California at Berkeley, where he early witnessed some of the student unrest about which he was to write. He constantly challenged the leaders of the student movement and appeared in a widely publicized debate with student leader Mario Savio. He left Berkeley to go to the University of Toronto. His last teaching position was as University Professor at the University of Virginia, and was professor emeritus at the time of his death in 2002.

Feuer visited the Soviet Union during one of the first academic exchanges in the period after Stalin's death, often referred to as "the Thaw" and was expelled for challenging Soviet orthodoxies regarding Marxist thought. His experiences at Berkeley, where he challenged left wing student movements and professors who ceded to their demands, led Feuer to reject left wing, radical politics and he wrote continuously after this period about the corrupting influences of ideology on thought, the dangers of totalitarianism in the modern world and the role of the United States as a bulwark against tyranny and authoritarianism in the modern world. His edited collection, Karl Marx and Friedrich Engels: Basic Writings on Politics and Philosophy (1959) is one of the most widely used readers on Marxian thought ever published. Politically, he was closely allied with the philosophical anti-communism of Sidney Hook.

His work ranged across a wide range of fields such as Marxist and neo-Marxist thought, the sociology of knowledge, the sociology of science, sociological theory, ideology and intellectuals, the history of ideas, the sociology of generations, the history and sociology of Jews and Judaism, and philosophy. He was one of the earliest interpreters of the relationship between psychoanalysis and philosophy and produced many studies of the psychoanalytic dimensions of ideology and intellectual life. His extensive knowledge of the more arcane intricacies of Marx's life and a deep love of the fictional character of Sherlock Holmes were the basis for a novel entitled The Case of the Revolutionist's Daughter: Sherlock Holmes Meets Karl Marx (1983). The novel can be read as a critique of Marx's personal moral failings, which call into question his philosophy and politics.

After rejecting Marxism, Feuer reportedly adopted the mantra, "For Hegel, I would not give a bagel."

== Works ==
- Spinoza and the Rise Of Liberalism (1951)
- Psychoanalysis and Ethics (1955)
- Karl Marx And Friedrich Engels: political and philosophical writings (1959), editor
- The Scientific Intellectual: the psychological and sociological origins of modern science (1963)
- The Conflict of Generations: the character and significance of student movements (1969)
- Marx and the Intellectuals: A Set of Post-Ideological Essays (1969)
- Einstein and the Generations of Science (1974)
- Ideology and the Ideologists (1975)
- The Case of the Revolutionist's Daughter: Sherlock Holmes Meets Karl Marx (1983)
- Imperialism and the Anti-imperialist Mind (1986)
- Varieties of Scientific Experience: emotive aims in scientific hypotheses (1995)
