= The Other Side: The Secret Relationship Between Nazism and Zionism =

1984 book by Mahmoud Abbas

The Other Side: the Secret Relationship Between Nazism and Zionism
- Author: Mahmoud Abbas
- Original title: Al-wajh al-ʾāḫar: al-ʿalāqāt as-sirriyya bayna n-nāziyya wa-ṣ-ṣiḥyūniyya
- Language: Arabic
- Subject: History
- Publisher: Dar Ibn Rushd
- Publication date: 1984. 2nd edition 2011 by Billsan Publishing House, Ramallah, Palestine.
- Publication place: Jordan
- Pages: 253

The Other Side: the Secret Relationship Between Nazism and Zionism (Arabic: الوجه الآخر: العلاقات السرية بين النازية والصهيونية, romanized: Al-wajh al-ʾāḫar: al-ʿalāqāt as-sirriyya bayna n-nāziyya wa-ṣ-ṣiḥyūniyya) is a book by Mahmoud Abbas, published in 1984 in Arabic. It was re-published in 2011. It is based on his CandSc thesis, completed in 1982 at Patrice Lumumba University (now the Peoples' Friendship University of Russia) under the title The Connection between the Nazis and the Leaders of the Zionist Movement, and defended at the Institute of Oriental Studies of the Soviet Academy of Sciences. The central thesis of the book is that the Zionist movement and its leaders were "fundamental partners" of the Nazis and equally responsible for the Holocaust.

Abbas' Holocaust revisionism does not deny that the Holocaust happened or that it is one of the worst crimes in history. The question he raises is who is guilty of this crime; he posits that blaming the Nazis is only "half the truth". According to Abbas, the Zionists collaborated in killing a large number of European Jews in order to encourage the rest to embrace Zionism and emigrate to Palestine. The book refers to the Haavara Agreement, in which the Third Reich agreed with the Jewish Agency to facilitate Jewish emigration from Germany to Mandatory Palestine. He suggests that Israel's abduction, trial and subsequent execution of Adolf Eichmann, the high ranking Nazi who was a main architect behind the Holocaust, was a cover-up operation. Eichmann was in the process of revealing the involvement of the Zionists in the making of the Holocaust to the American magazine Life and was therefore silenced, says Abbas in the book.

== Study at Patrice Lumumba University ==
Abbas attended Patrice Lumumba University to prepare and present his doctoral thesis. The institute's director at the time, Yevgeny Primakov, one of the Soviet masterminds of active measures and academic research, such as Operation INFEKTION, supported a Soviet specialist on Palestine, Vladimir Ivanovich Kisilev as Abbas' dissertation adviser. They communicated mostly in English and Arabic. In an interview with the magazine Kommersant 20 years later, Kisilev remembers Abbas as a well-prepared graduate student, who came to Moscow with an already chosen research topic and a large amount of already prepared material.

The title of Abbas' thesis is The Connection between the Nazis and the Leaders of the Zionist Movement or, in Russian, "Связи между сионизмом и нацизмом. 1933–1945". In 1984, a book based on Abbas' doctoral dissertation was published in Arabic by Dar Ibn Rushd publishers in Amman, Jordan under the title al-Wajh al-akhar : al-'alaqat al-sirriyah bayna al-Naziyah wa-al-Sihyuniyah.

== Content of the thesis and book ==
The thesis of the book is that the Zionist movement and its leaders were the partners of the Nazis in planning and carrying out the Holocaust. He builds the case on the Haavara Agreement of 1933, in which the Third Reich agreed with the Jewish Agency to enable Jews to emigrate from Germany directly to Mandatory Palestine, which he sees as evidence of collaboration.

According to Abbas, the Zionists worked with Hitler on making Europe unlivable for Jews in order to force them to move to Palestine:

The Zionist movement led a broad campaign of incitement against the Jews living under Nazi rule to arouse the government's hatred of them, to fuel vengeance against them and to expand the mass extermination.

every racist in the world was given the green light, and first and foremost Hitler and the Nazis, to do with the Jews as they wish, as long as it ensures Jewish immigration to Palestine.

According to Abbas' thesis, the Western powers that won the war and convicted the Nazis for war crimes in the Nuremberg trials chose to hide the Zionist participation in the Holocaust:

They used the details, events and crimes as they liked, and ignored everything they wanted to ignore … Eventually they accused the leaders of Nazism of all the crimes that occurred during that war, and persecuted [them] for an unlimited period, without any statute of limitations … thus these countries only dealt with half of the truth, and neglected – deliberately – the second half.

Abbas describes the number of Jews murdered in the Nazi Holocaust as agreed upon by mainstream historians, six million, as a "fantastic lie". In the book, he wrote:

It seems that the interest of the Zionist movement, however, is to inflate this figure so that their gains will be greater. This led them to emphasize this figure [six million] in order to gain the solidarity of international public opinion with Zionism. Many scholars have debated the figure of six million and reached stunning conclusions — fixing the number of Jewish victims at only a few hundred thousand.

Abbas quotes historian Raul Hilberg to support his allegations that fewer than one million Jews were killed. However, Rafael Medoff of the David S. Wyman Institute for Holocaust Studies denied the assertion that "The historian and author, Raoul Hilberg, thinks that the figure does not exceed 890,000", and said this is "utterly false". He wrote that "Professor Hilberg, a distinguished historian and author of the classic study The Destruction of the European Jews, has never said or written any such thing."

In the book Abbas raises doubts regarding the existence of the gas chambers, quoting Robert Faurisson, on the nonexistence of gas chambers.

in a scientific study published by French professor Robert Faurisson, he attacked the existence of such chambers for those alleged purposes [to kill jews], and stated with certainty that they were solely for cremating bodies, for fear of the spread of disease and bacteria in nearby areas.

A global survey of Holocaust denial, published by David S. Wyman Institute for Holocaust Studies in 2004, describes the book as "denying the Holocaust".

== Political controversy and Abbas' clarifications ==
After Abbas was appointed prime minister of the Palestinian Authority in 2003, the Israel Defense Forces removed excerpts from the Abbas book from its website, including quotes questioning the use of gas chambers and talking of less than one million victims.

Abbas has been accused of Holocaust denial. In the book, he argues that Zionists created "the myth" of six million murdered Jews, which he calls a "fantastic lie".

In his May 2003 interview with Haaretz, Abbas stated:

I wrote in detail about the Holocaust and said I did not want to discuss numbers. I quoted an argument between historians in which various numbers of casualties were mentioned. One wrote there were twelve million victims and another wrote there were 800,000. I have no desire to argue with the figures. The Holocaust was a terrible, unforgivable crime against the Jewish nation, a crime against humanity that cannot be accepted by humankind. The Holocaust was a terrible thing and nobody can claim I denied it.

In a 2003 interview in The New York Times, he said: "When I wrote The Other Side ... we were at war with Israel. Today I would not have made such remarks."

In an interview with the Ma'an news agency in 2013, Abbas defended his doctoral thesis regarding the relationship between the Zionists and the Nazis and said he "challenges anyone who can deny that the Zionist movement had ties with the Nazis before World War II."
