= Haavara Agreement =

Agreement between Nazi Germany and Zionist organizations

The Haavara Agreement (Hebrew: הֶסְכֵּם הַעֲבָרָה, romanized: heskem haavara, lit. 'transfer agreement') was an agreement between Nazi Germany and Zionist organizations signed on 25 August 1933. The agreement was finalized after three months of talks by the Zionist Federation of Germany, the Anglo-Palestine Bank (under the directive of the Jewish Agency), and the economic authorities of Nazi Germany. It was a major factor in making possible the migration of approximately 60,000 German Jews to Palestine between 1933 and 1939.

The agreement enabled Jews fleeing persecution under the new Nazi regime to transfer some portion of their assets to British Mandatory Palestine. Emigrants sold their assets in Germany to pay for essential goods (manufactured in Germany) to be shipped to Mandatory Palestine. The agreement was controversial and was criticised by Revisionist Zionist leader Ze'ev Jabotinsky and by some non-Zionist Jews, as well as by members of both the Nazi Party and the German public. For German Jews, the agreement offered a way to leave an increasingly hostile environment; for the Yishuv, the Jewish community in Palestine, it offered access to both immigrant labour and economic support; for the German authorities it facilitated the emigration of Jews while breaking the anti-Nazi boycott of 1933, which had mass support among European and American Jews and was thought by the state to be a potential threat to the economy.

== Background ==
Although the Nazi Party won the greatest share of the popular vote in the two Reichstag general elections of 1932, they did not have a majority, so Hitler led a short-lived coalition government formed by the Nazis and the German National People's Party. Under pressure from politicians, industrialists and others, President Paul von Hindenburg appointed Hitler as Chancellor of Germany on 30 January 1933. This event is known as the Machtergreifung ('seizure of power'). In the following months, the Nazis used a process termed Gleichschaltung (roughly 'bringing into line') to consolidate power. By June 1933, virtually the only organisations not under the control of the Nazi party were the army and the churches.

Within the Nazi movement, a variety of increasingly radical "solutions" to the "Jewish Question" were proposed both before and while the Nazi party was in government, including expulsion and the encouragement of voluntary emigration. Widespread civil persecution of German Jews began as soon as the Nazis were in power. For example, on 1 April, the Nazis organized a nationwide boycott of Jewish-owned businesses in Germany; under the Law for the Restoration of the Professional Civil Service, which was implemented on 7 April, Jews were excluded from the civil service; on 25 April, quotas were imposed on the number of Jews in schools and universities. Jews outside Germany responded to these persecutions with a boycott of German goods, which appeared to some Nazis to threaten the Reich.

Meanwhile, in Mandatory Palestine, a growing Jewish population (174,610 in 1931, rising to 384,078 in 1936 and 600,000 in 1948) was acquiring land and developing the structures of a future Jewish state despite conflicting sentiments within the population of Mandatory Palestine.

== Hanotea company ==
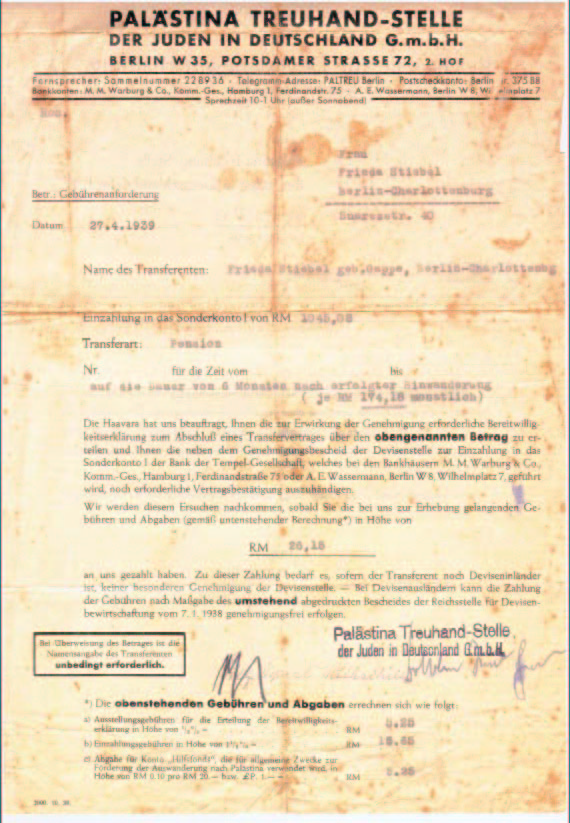
Transfer agreement used by the Palästina Treuhandstelle ('Palestine Trustee Office'), established specifically to assist Jews fleeing the Nazi regime to recover some portion of the assets they had been forced to surrender when they fled Nazi Germany

Hanotea (הַנּוֹטֵעַ 'the Planter') was a citrus planting company based in Netanya and established in 1929 by second-generation Jewish farmers in Palestine involved in the Benei Binyamin movement. In an arrangement with the Reich Economics Ministry, the blocked German bank accounts of prospective immigrants would be unblocked and funds from them used by Hanotea to buy agricultural German goods; these goods, along with the immigrants, would then go to Palestine, and the immigrants would be granted a house or citrus plantation by the company of the same value. Hanotea's director, Sam Cohen, represented the company in direct negotiation with the Reich Economics Ministry beginning in March 1933. In May 1933 Hanotea applied for permission to transfer capital from Germany to Palestine. This pilot arrangement appeared to be operating successfully, and so paved the way for the later Haavara Agreement.

== The transfer agreement ==
The Haavara (Transfer) Agreement, negotiated by Eliezer Hoofein, director of the Anglo-Palestine Bank, was agreed to by the Reich Economics Ministry in 1933, and continued, with declining German government support, until it was wound up in 1939. The agreement provided a substantial export market for German factories to British-ruled Palestine. Between November 1933, and 31 December 1937, 77.8 million ℛ︁ℳ︁, equivalent to €349.2 million in 2021, or $22,500,000 in 1938 currency, worth of goods were exported to Jewish businesses in Palestine under the program. By the time the program ended with the start of World War II, the total had risen to 105 million ℛ︁ℳ︁, equivalent to €467 million in 2021, or about $35,000,000 in 1939.

Emigrants with capital of £1,000, equivalent to £56,500 in 2025, (about $5,000 in 1930s currency value) could move to Palestine in spite of severe British restrictions on Jewish immigration under an immigrant investor program similar to the modern United States EB-5 visa. Under the Transfer Agreement, about 39% of an emigrant's funds were given to Jewish communal economic development projects, leaving individuals with about 43% of the funds.

The Haavara Agreement was thought by some German circles to be a possible way to solve the "Jewish problem." The head of the Middle Eastern division of the foreign ministry, the anti-Nazi politician Werner Otto von Hentig, supported the policy of settling Jews in Palestine. Hentig believed that if the Jewish population was concentrated in a single foreign entity, then foreign diplomatic policy and containment of the Jews would become easier. Hitler's own support of the Haavara Agreement was unclear and varied throughout the 1930s. Initially, Hitler seemed indifferent to the economic details of the plan, but he supported it in the period from September 1937 to 1939.

After the German invasion of Poland in September 1939, the program was ended.

CERTIFICATE

The Trust and Transfer Office "Haavara" Ltd. places at the disposal of the Banks in Palestine amounts in Reichmarks which have been put at its disposal by the Jewish immigrants from Germany. The Banks avail themselves of these amounts in Reichmarks in order to make payments on behalf of Palestinian merchants for goods imported by them from Germany. The merchants pay in the value of the goods to the Banks and the "Haavara" Ltd. pays the countervalue to the Jewish immigrants from Germany. To the same extent that local merchants will make use of this arrangement, the import of German goods will serve to withdraw Jewish capital from Germany.

The Trust and Transfer Office,

HAAVARA, LTD.

— Example of the certificate issued by Haavara to Jews emigrating to Palestine

== Responses ==
The agreement was controversial both within the Nazi party and in the Zionist movement. As historian Edwin Black put it, "The Transfer Agreement tore the Jewish world apart, turning leader against leader, threatening rebellion and even assassination." Opposition came from the mainstream US leadership of the World Zionist Congress, in particular Abba Hillel Silver and American Jewish Congress president Rabbi Stephen Wise. Wise and other leaders of the 1933 anti-Nazi boycott argued against the agreement, narrowly failing to persuade the Nineteenth Zionist Congress in August 1935 to vote against it.

The right-wing Revisionist Zionists and their leader Vladimir Jabotinsky were even more vocal in their opposition. The Revisionist newspaper in Palestine, Hazit Haam published a sharp denunciation of those involved in the agreement as "betrayers", and shortly afterwards one of the negotiators, Haim Arlosoroff was assassinated.

In the post-war period, the agreement has sometimes been cited by anti-Zionists (Ken Livingstone, Lyndon LaRouche, Louis Farrakhan, Mark Weber, Joseph Massad, Mahmoud Abbas) as evidence of Nazi support for Zionism or Zionist collaboration with the Nazis. Keith Kahn-Harris responds to this interpretation that "making an agreement with Zionists did not make Hitler a supporter of Zionism any more than the Nazi–Soviet pact made him a supporter of communism."

== See also ==
- Évian Conference (1938), dealing with German and Austrian Jewish refugees
- Fifth Aliyah (1929–1939), wave of Jewish emigration to Mandate Palestine
- Magda Goebbels, possible mediator between Arlozoroff and the Nazi leadership
- Madagascar Plan (1940), Nazi plan for the forcible relocation of European Jews
- Leopold von Mildenstein (1902–1968), SS officer and supporter of some of the aims of Zionism
- The Transfer Agreement (1984), book about the Haavara Agreement
