= Sri Lanka Campaign for Peace and Justice =

Sri Lankan human rights groups

- Formation: 2009
- Leader: Charu Lata Hogg
- Key people: Lakhdar Brahimi
- Website: Sri Lanka Campaign for Peace and Justice

Sri Lanka Campaign for Peace and Justice is an international, non profit, human rights group founded in 2009 to seek justice for thousands of Tamils killed during the final stages of the Sri Lankan Civil War and promote lasting peace. Charu Lata Hogg is the chair of the group and advisory council members include Lakhdar Brahimi.

== Objectives ==
The objectives of the Sri Lanka Campaign are to:

1. Achieve genuine reconciliation based on accountability for violations of international law

2. Build respect for human rights and the rule of law

3. Support efforts within Sri Lankan civil society to promote a just and lasting peace
