= Edward Mortimer =

British journalist (1943–2021)

Edward Mortimer CMG
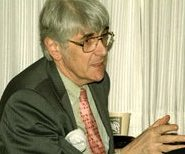
- Born: 22 December 1943; Burford, Oxfordshire, England
- Died: 18 June 2021 (aged 77); Oxford, England
- Education: Balliol College, Oxford; All Souls College, Oxford
- Occupations: Civil servant; journalist; academic
- Spouse: Elizabeth Zanetti (m. 1968)
- Children: 4

Edward Mortimer CMG (22 December 1943 – 18 June 2021) was a UN civil servant, journalist, author and academic. He was Distinguished Fellow of All Souls College, Oxford, from 2013. From 2001 to 2006, he was the Director of Communications in the Executive Office of the United Nations Secretary-General Kofi Annan and was the chief speechwriter from 1998 to 2006. He was the chair of the Sri Lanka Campaign for Peace and Justice from 2010 to 2015 and one of the key people integral to the creation of the Campaign.

Mortimer was appointed Companion of the Order of St Michael and St George (CMG) in the 2010 New Year Honours.

== Early life and education ==
Edward Mortimer was born on 22 December 1943 in Burford, Oxfordshire, the son of Robert Mortimer, Regius Professor of Moral Theology at Christ Church, Oxford and later Bishop of Exeter and his wife Mary. Mortimer was a scholar at Eton College and studied history at Balliol College, Oxford, from 1962 to 1965, graduating with a congratulatory first, and was a Prize Fellow at All Souls College, Oxford, from 1965 to 1972. In 1963, during his time at Balliol, he was part of the team that reached the final of the first series of University Challenge, losing to Leicester University.

== Career ==
Before university Mortimer went to Senegal to do Voluntary Service Overseas, and taught English for a short period in a lycée in St Louis. After leaving Oxford he went to Paris to do research for a PhD, but set it aside in 1967 when he was hired as a reporter in The Times Paris office. He returned to Oxford in 1970 to write a book on the French Communist Party. During his time in Paris he documented the student riots and the last days of Charles de Gaulle's presidency. Left-leaning in his politics, he later reflected that "For me, May 1968 was certainly the high point of the Sixties." He went on to become a columnist and leader writer for The Times and foreign affairs editor for the Financial Times. Between 2007 and 2012 he was Senior Vice President of the Salzburg Global Seminar and was a member of the Advisory Council of Independent Diplomat.

== Personal life ==
Mortimer married painter and sculptor Elizabeth Zanetti in Exeter in 1968; together they had four children. He died of prostate cancer at Churchill Hospital in Oxford on 18 June 2021, aged 77.

== Selected bibliography ==
1. France and the Africans, 1944-60: A Political History Faber & Faber, 1969.
2. Faith and Power, the politics of Islam Random House, New York, 1982.
3. Roosevelt's Children: Tomorrow's World Leaders and Their World Hamish Hamilton Ltd, 1987.
4. The World That FDR Built: Vision and Reality Scribner, 1989.
