= Edwin Black =

American journalist (born 1950)

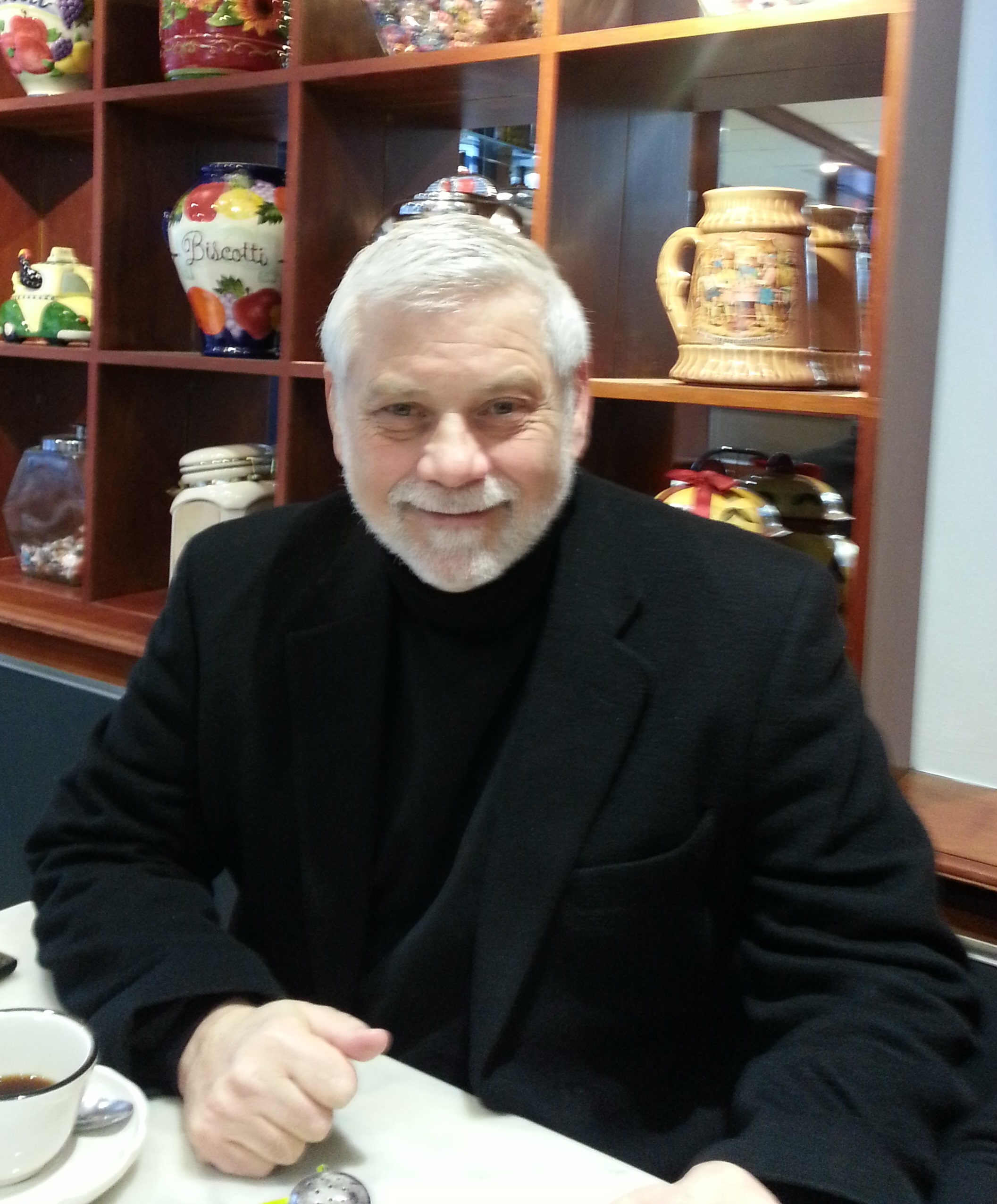
- Edwin Black in March 2014
- Born: Chicago, Illinois, U.S.
- Occupations: Author, journalist, historian, talk show host
- Writing career
- Genre: Non-fiction
- Notable awards: American Society of Journalists and Authors Best Nonfiction Investigative Book of the year for IBM and the Holocaust, 2003

Edwin Black (born February 27, 1950) is an American historian and author, as well as a syndicated columnist, investigative journalist, and weekly talk show host on The Edwin Black Show. He specializes in human rights, the historical interplay between economics and politics in the Middle East, petroleum policy, academic fraud, corporate criminality and abuse, and the financial underpinnings of Nazi Germany.

== Biography ==
=== Early years ===
Black is the son of Holocaust survivors from Poland. His mother, Ethel "Edjya" Katz, from Białystok, told of narrowly escaping death during the Holocaust by escaping a boxcar en route to the Treblinka extermination camp as a 13-year old in August 1943. After escaping, she was shot by militiamen and then rescued by a Polish Jewish fighter whom she later married. Black's father described escaping death by fleeing to the woods from a long march to an isolated "shooting pit" and subsequently fighting the Nazis as a Betar partisan. The pair survived World War II by hiding in the forests of Poland for two years, emerging only after the end of the conflict and emigrating to the United States.

Of his own origins, Black has written: "I was born in Chicago, raised in Jewish neighborhoods, and my parents never tried to speak of their experience again." In his book The Transfer Agreement, Black notes that following in the beliefs of his parents, he was from his earliest days a supporter of the State of Israel. As a young man he spent time on a kibbutz, visited Israel on several other occasions, and gave earnest consideration to permanent residency there.

=== Career ===
Black started working as a professional journalist while still in high school, later attending university where he further developed the craft. He also was a frequent freelance contributor to the four major Chicago newspapers of the day, the Tribune, the Daily News, the Sun-Times, and Chicago Today, as well as such weeklies as Chicago Reader and Chicago Magazine. In the late 1970s, he was the editor of Chicago Monthly.

One of Black's first forays into investigative journalism began in 1970 with a commission from Atlantic Monthly. He was tasked with finding out about an alleged plot to assassinate President Kennedy in Chicago on November 2, 1963. For Black it was a long and difficult assignment that finally resulted in his November 1975 article in Chicago Independent magazine. He noted in the article how he became the subject of government harassment. His apartment was broken into and his files "were obviously and clumsily searched." He described his many months of scrutinizing documents, following hundreds of leads, and conducting dozens of interviews. But he wrote that his main source of information was a Secret Service agent on duty at the time of the events in Chicago. Although Black did not name this agent, it is strongly believed to have been Secret Service whistleblower Abraham Bolden.

In 1978, Black interviewed the American Civil Liberties Union lawyer who represented members of the American Nazi Party, which had marched provocatively through the predominantly Jewish Chicago suburb of Skokie. In preparing himself for that interview, Black's interest was piqued by the hidden history of relations between the government of Adolf Hitler and German-Jewish Zionists during the initial years of the Nazi regime. Five years of research followed, ending in the 1984 publication of his first book, The Transfer Agreement: The Dramatic Story of the Pact Between the Third Reich and Jewish Palestine.

In the early 1990s, Black served as the editor-in-chief for OS/2 Professional magazine and OS/2 Week, and reported on OS/2 users and technology. Black's books have typically made use of networks of volunteer and professional researchers assembled for each project. Three years before completion of his 2001 book, IBM and the Holocaust, Black began to put together what would ultimately become a team of more than 100 researchers, translators, and assistants to work on discovery and analysis of primary source documents written in German, French, and Polish. In all, more than 20,000 documents from some 50 different libraries, archives, museums, and other collections were assembled and analyzed in the writing of the book.

In 2006, Black wrote an article on Iran and the Holocaust, claiming that there was an "Iran-Nazi alliance" during World War Two, that Reza Shah was inspired to rename his country from Persia to Iran by Nazi agents, and that "Iran and its leaders were not only aware of the Holocaust, they played both sides" because Jewish refugees passing through Iran had to pay exorbitant fees. The article was criticized by the Iranian historian Abbas Milani, who instead argued that Iran did not charge any money at all, that Nazi agents had no role in Reza Shah's renaming decision, and that there was no Iran-Nazi alliance.

In the fall of 2012, it was reported that Plan B, the production company owned by actor Brad Pitt, had taken an option on a cinematic adaptation of Black's IBM and the Holocaust. Marcus Hinchey, co-writer of the 2010 film All Good Things, was tapped for script-writing responsibilities. Black has written on topics beyond that of 1933–1945 German history, including books on the issue of oil dependence, the history of Iraq, and alternative energy. He is presently a syndicated columnist in publications in the United States, Israel, and elsewhere. Black has also occasionally written on the subject of film and television music, contributing opinion pieces and composer interviews to various print and online publications. An aficionado of musical soundtracks, Black regularly credits specific works which have provided "musical inspiration that propelled the writing" in the introductory notes to each book.

In 2010, in his book The Farhud, Black resurrected the "Forgotten Pogrom", the bloody June 1–2, 1941, pogrom against the Jews of Baghdad, known as the Farhud, sometimes called the Iraqi Kristallnacht. In 2015, Black founded the annual commemoration, International Farhud Day, which he proclaimed at the United Nations in a live globally-streamed event in 2015. The remembrance has been recognized and observed in many countries and in 2021, it was reported in the media that 10,000 people in numerous countries lit candles. He originated the Yom HaGirush commemoration, November 30, commemorating the expulsion of 850,000 Jews from Arab countries after the State of Israel was declared its independence, in a broadcast of the Edwin Black Show in 2021.

Black has coined or popularized certain words and terms. These include: "petropolitical" in lectures during the 1973 Arab Oil Embargo; "digital ghetto" and/or "algorithm ghetto" in 2001 during lectures on the book IBM and the Holocaust, and again at the 2018 Michigan Holocaust Day Commemoration.

Black has written an article critical of Wikipedia, "Wikipedia—The Dumbing Down of World Knowledge".

=== Selected book tours ===
In February and March 2014, Black embarked upon a "Parliamentary Tour" in which he appeared at four parliaments in a four-week period, including the House of Commons of the United Kingdom in London, the European Parliament in Brussels, the Knesset in Jerusalem, and the Foreign Affairs Committee of the United States House of Representatives in Washington D.C.

In November and December 2014, Black went on a 45-event "Human Rights Tour". In North Carolina, Black reportedly appeared nine times in three days speaking out against the persecution of Yazidis, Shia Muslims, and Christians in Iraq, racial injustice in the United States, and its impact on the November elections, as well as environmental injustice arising out of oil addiction, journalistic ethics in covering human rights, bias against Jews in Israel, and a health care crisis in the Middle East.

From May 31 to June 3, 2016, Black embarked upon a 100-hour, four-city, three-country commemoration book tour to observe International Farhud Day on the 75th anniversary of the Farhud. Black originated International Farhud Day the year before. The tour began on May 31 in the morning in the House of Representatives in Washington, D.C., then shifted to the Edmond J. Safra Congregation in New York the evening that same day. On June 2, he led the book and commemoration ceremony in London with the Israeli Embassy at the Lauderdale Rd Synagogue. On June 3, he arrived in Israel for a series of Farhud book and commemoration events that ended with a ceremony in the Knesset.

== Selected awards and citations ==
=== Literary ===
Black's ten works of non-fiction have been translated into an array of non-English languages, including French, Polish, Hungarian, Dutch, German, Spanish, Japanese, Portuguese, and Hebrew.

- 2007: Honorable Mention for General Non-Fiction Books from the ASJA for the book Internal Combustion.
- 2005: Best World Affairs Book Award from the Great Lakes chapter of the World Affairs Council for Banking on Baghdad.
- 2003: Donald Robinson Award for Investigative Journalism from the ASJA for the article "Final Solutions: How IBM Helped Automate the Nazi Death Machine in Poland," published in The Village Voice.
- 2003: Outstanding Book Award: General Nonfiction from the American Society of Journalists and Authors (ASJA) for the book IBM and the Holocaust.
- 1985: Carl Sandburg Award of the Friends of the Chicago Public Library for best non-fiction book of 1984, for The Transfer Agreement.

=== Human rights ===
- 2016: "Moral Compass Award" from The Holocaust Museum and Education Center of Southwest Florida for lifelong achievement.
- 2011: "Moral Courage Award" for War Against the Weak, granted by The Initiative for Moral Courage, San Diego State University, and Joan B. Kroc Institute for Peace and Justice, The Center for Ethics in Science and Technology, USC Shoah Foundation Institute for Visual History and Education, The Anti-Defamation League, California State University, San Marcos Arts & Lectures, Institute for World Justice, Daniel Pearl Music Days, Harmony for Humanity, Armenian Law Students Association, and Thomas Jefferson School of Law.
- 2011: "Drum Major for Justice Award" for War Against the Weak, granted by North Carolina Central University.
- 2011: "Justice for All Award," for War Against the Weak, granted in a Congressional ceremony by the American Association of People with Disabilities.

=== Governmental ===
- 2016: "Special Tribute" from The State of Michigan Legislature, 98th Legislature, for his research and achievement on the topic of Slavery to Freedom, signed and presented by State Representatives Sheldon Neely, Samir Singhm and State Senator Curtis Hertel Jr.
- 2007: "Commendation Award," from the State of California, for achievement in alternative energy, signed and presented by Governor Arnold Schwarzenegger.
- 2006: "Commendation Award," from the City of Los Angeles, for lifetime achievement in community service, signed and presented by Mayor Antonio Villaraigosa.
- 2003: "Edwin Black Day," from the City of Las Vegas, for lifetime achievement in investigative journalism, signed and presented by Mayor Oscar Goodman.

=== Organizational ===
- 2010: "Merit Citation" from Hadassah for The Farhud.
- 2007: "Integrity Award" from American Jewish Congress, for lifetime achievement.
- 2004: "Dona Gracia Medal" from International Association of Sephardic Progress for Banking on Baghdad.
- 1984: "Extraordinary Service" from the Jewish War Veterans for The Transfer Agreement.

=== Energy ===
- 2007: "The Thomas Edison Award" from the American Jewish Congress for Internal Combustion.
- 2007: "The Green Globes" from the Harmony Festival, for Internal Combustion.

== Works ==
=== Books ===
- The Transfer Agreement: The Dramatic Story of the Pact Between the Third Reich and Jewish Palestine. New York: Macmillan, 1984.
- Format C: (novel) Washington, DC: Dialog Press, 1999.
- — (12 February 2001). IBM and the Holocaust: The Strategic Alliance Between Nazi Germany and America's Most Powerful Corporation (First ed.). New York: Crown Publishing Group. ISBN 978-0609607992. LCCN 2001028201. OCLC 45896166. OL 23245381M.
- War Against the Weak: Eugenics and America's Campaign to Create a Master Race. New York: Basic Books, 2003.
- Banking on Baghdad: Inside Iraq's 7,000-Year History of War, Profit, and Conflict. Hoboken, NJ: John Wiley & Sons, 2004.
- Internal Combustion: How Corporations and Governments Addicted the World to Oil and Derailed the Alternatives. New York: St. Martin's Press, 2006.
- The Plan: How to Rescue Society When the Oil Stops — or the Day Before. (cover title) Washington, DC: Dialog Press, 2008.
- Nazi Nexus: America's Corporate Connections to Hitler's Holocaust. Washington, DC: Dialog Press, 2009.
- The Farhud: The Arab-Nazi Alliance in the Holocaust. Washington, DC: Dialog Press, 2010.
- British Petroleum and the Redline Agreement. Washington, DC: Dialog Press, 2011.
- Financing the Flames: How Tax-Exempt and Public Money Fuel a Culture of Confrontation and Terror in Israel. Washington, DC: Dialog Press, 2013.

=== Anthology contributions ===
- Götz Aly and Karl Heinz Roth, The Nazi Census: Identification and Control in the Third Reich. Introduction and translation by Edwin Black. Additional translation by Assenka Oksiloff. Philadelphia: Temple University Press, 2004.
- John Friedman (ed.), The Secret Histories: Hidden Truths That Challenged the Past and Changed the World. New York: Picador Books, 2005. Chapter: IBM and the Holocaust.
- Eric Katz (ed.), Death By Design: Science, Technology, and Engineering in Nazi Germany. New York: Pearson Longman, 2006. Chapter: IBM and the Holocaust.
- Alan Dershowitz (ed.), What Israel Means to Me: By 80 Prominent Writers, Performers, Scholars, Politicians, and Journalists. Hoboken, NJ: John Wiley & Sons, 2006. Chapter: Israel and Me.
- Michael T. Wilson (ed.), Democracy: Opposing Viewpoints. Farmington Hills, MI : Greenhaven Press/Thomson Gale, 2006. Chapter: On Democracy.
- Arthur L. Caplan (Editor), Robert Arp (Editor), Contemporary Debates in Bioethics, Wiley Blackwell; 2013. Chapter: Human Genetic Enhancement—The Slippery Slope to Genocide.
- Fernando De Maio (Editor), M.D. Raj C. Shah MD (Editor), John Mazzeo (Editor), David A. Ansell MD (Editor), Community Health Equity: A Chicago Reader Paperback, University of Chicago Press; 2019. Chapter: Racism in Red Blood Cells.

=== Contributions to video and film documentaries ===
- IBM's Role and the Holocaust, Guerrilla News Network, 2002.
- Racism: A History, BBC, 2007.
