= 1933 anti-Nazi boycott =

Boycott of German products by foreign critics of the Nazi Party

The anti-Nazi boycott was an international boycott of German products in response to violence and harassment by members of Adolf Hitler's Nazi Party against Jews following his appointment as Chancellor of Germany on January 30, 1933. Examples of Nazi violence and harassment included placing and throwing stink bombs, picketing, shopper intimidation, humiliation, and assaults. The boycott was spearheaded by some Jewish organizations but opposed by others.

== History ==
=== Events in Germany ===
Following Adolf Hitler's appointment as German Chancellor in January 1933, an organized campaign of violence and boycotting was undertaken by Hitler's Nazi Party against Jewish businesses. The anti-Jewish boycott was tolerated and possibly organized by the regime, with Hermann Göring stating that "I shall employ the police, and without mercy, wherever German people are hurt, but I refuse to turn the police into a guard for Jewish stores".

The Central Jewish Association of Germany felt obliged to issue a statement of support for the regime and held that "the responsible government authorities [i.e. the Hitler regime] are unaware of the threatening situation", saying, "we do not believe our German fellow citizens will let themselves be carried away into committing excesses against the Jews." Prominent Jewish business leaders wrote letters in support of the Nazi regime calling on officials in the Jewish community in Palestine, as well as Jewish organizations abroad, to drop their efforts in organizing an economic boycott. The Association of German National Jews, a marginal group that supported Hitler in his early years, also argued against the Jewish boycott of German goods.

=== US and UK: Plans for a boycott ===
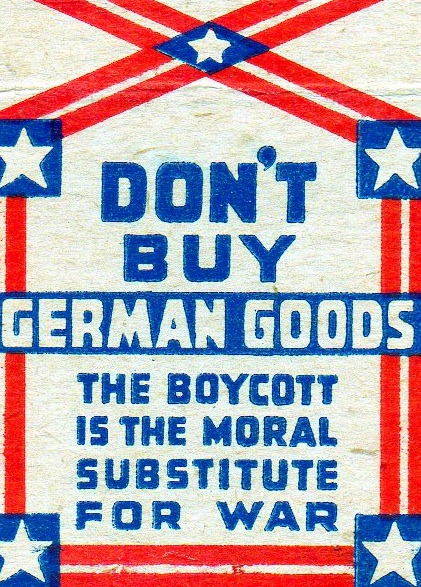
A matchbook cover issued by the Non-Sectarian Anti-Nazi League to advertise the boycott

In Britain the movement to boycott German goods was opposed by the conservative Board of Deputies of British Jews. In the United States a boycott committee was established by the American Jewish Congress (AJC), with B'nai B'rith and the American Jewish Committee abstaining. At that point, they were in agreement that further public protests might harm the Jews of Germany.

Unrelenting Nazi attacks on Jews in Germany in subsequent weeks led the American Jewish Congress to reconsider its opposition to public protests. In a contentious four-hour meeting held at the Hotel Astor in New York City on March 20, 1933, 1,500 representatives of various Jewish organizations met to consider a proposal by the American Jewish Congress to hold a protest meeting at Madison Square Garden on March 27, 1933. An additional 1,000 people attempting to enter the meeting were held back by police.

New York Supreme Court Justice Joseph M. Proskauer and James N. Rosenberg spoke out against a proposal for a boycott of German goods introduced by J. George Freedman of the Jewish War Veterans. Proskauer expressed his concerns of "causing more trouble for the Jews in Germany by unintelligent action", protesting against plans for and reading a letter from Judge Irving Lehman that warned that "the meeting may add to the terrible dangers of the Jews in Germany". Honorary president Rabbi Stephen Samuel Wise responded to Proskauer and Rosenberg, criticizing their failure to attend previous AJC meetings and insisting that "no attention would be paid to the edict" if mass protests were rejected as a tactic. Wise argued that "The time for prudence and caution is past. We must speak up like men. How can we ask our Christian friends to lift their voices in protest against the wrongs suffered by Jews if we keep silent? ... What is happening in Germany today may happen tomorrow in any other land on earth unless it is challenged and rebuked. It is not the German Jews who are being attacked. It is the Jews." He characterized the boycott as a moral imperative, stating, "We must speak out," and that "if that is unavailing, at least we shall have spoken". The group voted to go ahead with the meeting at Madison Square Garden.

In a meeting held at the Hotel Knickerbocker on March 21 by the Jewish War Veterans of the United States of America, former congressman William W. Cohen advocated a strict boycott of German goods, stating that "Any Jew buying one penny's worth of merchandise made in Germany is a traitor to his people." The Jewish War Veterans also planned a protest march in Manhattan from Cooper Square to New York City Hall, in which 20,000 would participate, including Jewish veterans in uniform, with no banners or placards allowed other than American and Jewish flags.

=== March 27, 1933: A National Day of Protest ===
A series of protest rallies were held on March 27, 1933, with the New York City rally held at Madison Square Garden with an overflow crowd of 55,000 inside and outside the arena and parallel events held in Baltimore, Boston, Chicago, Cleveland, Philadelphia and 70 other locations, with the proceedings at the New York rally broadcast worldwide. Speakers at the Garden included American Federation of Labor president William Green, Senator Robert F. Wagner, former Governor of New York Al Smith and a number of Christian clergymen, joining in a call for the end of the brutal treatment of German Jews. Rabbi Moses S. Margolies, spiritual leader of Manhattan's Congregation Kehilath Jeshurun, rose from his sickbed to address the crowd, bringing the 20,000 people in the arena to their feet with his prayers that the antisemitic persecution cease and that the hearts of Israel's enemies should be softened. Jewish organizations — including the American Jewish Congress, American League for Defense of Jewish Rights, B'nai B'rith, the Jewish Labor Committee and Jewish War Veterans — joined in a call for a boycott of German goods.

== Boycott ==
A news photograph of the "Boycott Nazi Germany" rally held in Madison Square Garden on March 15, 1937

The boycott began in March 1933 in both Europe and the US and continued until the entry of the US into the war on December 7, 1941.

By July 1933, the boycott had forced the resignation of the board of the Hamburg America Line. German imports to the US were reduced by nearly a quarter compared with the prior year, and the impact was weighing heavily on the regime. Joseph Goebbels expressed that it was a cause for "much concern" at the first Nuremberg party rally that August. German pharmaceutical companies were hit particularly hard. As one example, nearly two-thirds of the 652 practicing Jewish doctors in Mandatory Palestine stopped prescribing German medicines. However, at the same time, Zionists were brokering the Haavara Agreement with Germany to open trade in exchange for sending German Jews to Palestine. When German emigrants arrived in Palestine, they would receive a portion of their capital in the form of goods and the rest in pounds sterling. Both parties benefitted. For the Nazis, the agreement would drastically increase German Jewish emigration, fulfilling a central plank of their platform, while the capital purchases of German imports would help redeem the regime's promise to return the depression-ravaged economy to economic prosperity. For the Zionists, it would further their goals by helping populate Palestine with prosperous immigrants whose money could vastly improve the struggling economy.

A significant event in the boycott took place on March 15, 1937, when a "Boycott Nazi Germany" rally was held in Madison Square Garden in New York City.

Both inside and outside of Germany, the boycott was seen as a "reactive [and] aggressive" reaction by the Jewish community in response to the Nazi regime's persecutions; the Daily Express, a right-wing British newspaper, ran a headline on 24 March 1933 stating "Judea Declares War on Germany".

By the time the Second World War began, tens of thousands of German Jews had emigrated to Palestine under the Haavara and more than 35 million dollars’ worth of Jewish capital had been transferred from Germany to Palestine.

== Nazi counter-boycott ==
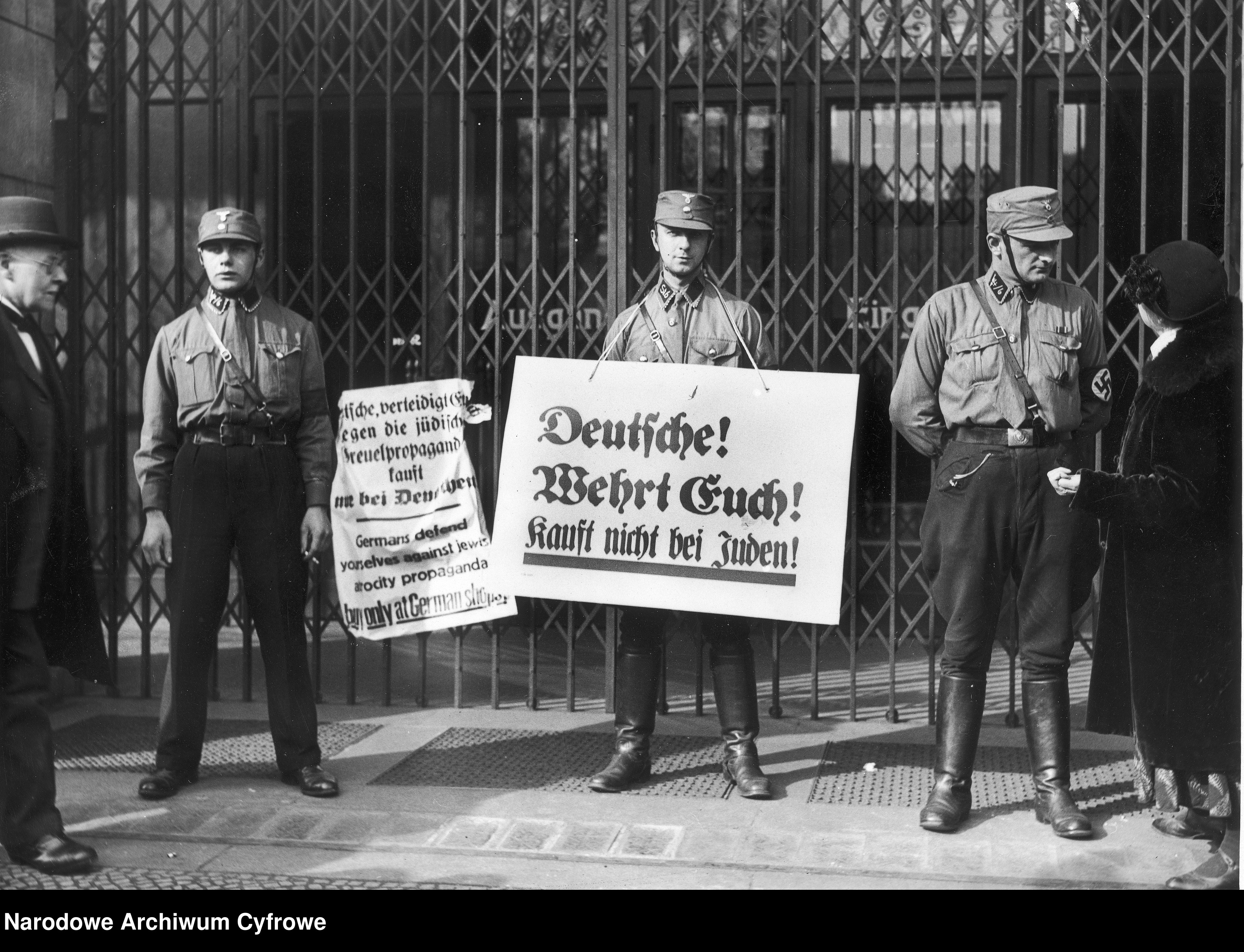
SA Brownshirts in Berlin on 1 April 1933 blocking the entrance to a Jewish-owned shop with boycott signs. The middle sign reads, "Germans! Defend yourselves! Don't buy from Jews!", and the left sign says in German and English, "Germans defend yourselves against jewish atrocity propaganda[!] buy only at German shops!"

Nazi officials denounced the protests as slanders against the Nazis perpetrated by "Jews of German origin", with Propaganda Minister Joseph Goebbels proclaiming that a series of "sharp countermeasures" would be taken against the Jews of Germany in response to the protests of American Jews. Goebbels announced a one-day boycott of Jewish businesses in Germany of his own to take place on 1 April 1933, which would be lifted if anti-Nazi protests were suspended. This was the Nazi government's first officially sanctioned anti-Jewish boycott. If the protests did not cease, Goebbels warned that "the boycott will be resumed... until German Jewry has been annihilated".

The anti-Jewish boycott threatened by Goebbels occurred, and Brownshirts were placed outside Jewish-owned department stores, retail establishments, and professional offices. The Star of David was painted in yellow and black on retail entrances and windows, and posters asserting "Don't buy from Jews!" (Kauf nicht bei Juden!) and "The Jews are our misfortune!" (Die Juden sind unser Unglück!) were pasted around. Physical violence against Jews and vandalism of Jewish-owned property took place, but the police intervened only rarely.

== Aftermath and legacy ==
The boycott was not successful in ending the harassment of Jews in Germany, which instead continued to build towards the Holocaust.

The Haavara Agreement, together with German rearmament and lessened dependence on trade with the West, had by 1937 largely negated the effects of the Jewish boycott on Germany. Nevertheless, the boycott campaign continued into 1939.

== See also ==
- Business collaboration with Nazi Germany
- Jewish war conspiracy theory
