= List of people from Bucharest =

Coat of arms of Bucharest

This is a list of native Bucharesters.

== A ==
- Otto Ackermann (1909–1960), conductor
- Anda Adam (born 1980), singer and model
- Gheorghe Adamescu (1869–1942), literary historian and bibliographer
- Olivia Addams (born 1996), singer
- Adena, singer
- Viorica Agarici (1886–1979), nurse and philanthropist, Righteous Among the Nations
- Adolf Albin (1848–1920), chess player
- Mircea Albulescu (1934–2016), actor
- Radu Aldulescu (born 1954), novelist
- Dan Andrei Aldea (1950–2020), singer
- Liana Alexandra (1947–2011), composer, pianist, and music educator
- Andrei Alexandrescu (born 1969), Romanian-American C++ and D language programmer and author
- George Alexandru (1957–2016), actor
- Nicoleta Alexandru (born 1968), singer
- Florin-Alexandru Alexe (born 1979), economist and politician
- Marius Alexe (born 1990), footballer
- Paul Alexiu (1893–1963), general
- Barbu Alinescu (1890–1952), general
- Mosko Alkalai (1931–2008), Israeli actor
- Radu Almășan (born 1980), singer
- Melek Amet (1960–2008), model
- Doru Ana (1954–2022), actor
- David Andelman (born 1955), Israeli theoretical physicist
- Aurelian Andreescu (1942—1986), singer
- Eva Andrei, American physicist
- Ion Andreescu (1850–1882), painter
- Mihail Andricu (1894–1974), singer
- Ion Valentin Anestin (1900–1963), graphic artist, engraver, painter, sculptor, journalist, and dramatist
- Luminița Anghel (born 1968), dance/pop recording artist, songwriter, and politician
- Babis Angourakis (1951–2014), Greek politician
- Edward Aninaru (born 1976), photographer
- Constantin Anton (1894–1993), general
- Kristaq Antoniu (1907–1979), singer
- Mitzura Arghezi (1924–2015), actress and politician
- Dan Apostol (1957–2013), writer
- Carol Ardeleanu (1883–1949), writer
- Tudor Arghezi (1880–1967), writer
- Costache Aristia (1800–1880), poet, actor, and translator
- Ștefan Arteni (1947–2020), artist, painter, calligrapher, architect, philosopher, historian, essayist, and translator
- Constantin C. Arion (1855–1923), politician
- Bazil Assan (1860–1918), engineer, explorer, and economist
- Alina Astafei (born 1969), track and field athlete
- Alexandru Athanasiu (born 1955), politician and jurist
- Genica Athanasiou (1897–1966), Romanian-French actress
- Vera Atkins (1908–2000), British intelligence officer
- Bogdan Aurescu (b. 1973), lawyer, diplomat and politician
- Colette Avital (born 1940), Israeli diplomat and politician
- Ana-Maria Avram (born 1961), composer
- Chris Avram (1931–1989), actor

== B ==
- Emanoil Bacaloglu (1830–1891), mathematician, physicist, and chemist
- Laura Badea-Cârlescu (b. 1970), fencer, Olympic, World and European champion in foil, International Fencing Hall of Famer
- Constantin Banu (1873–1940), writer, journalist, and politician
- Elisheva Barak-Ussoskin (born 1936), Israeli judge
- Eugen Barbu (1924–1993), novelist, short story writer, and journalist
- Linda Maria Baros (born 1981), poet, translator, and literary critic
- Cezar Bădiță (born 1979), swimmer
- Alexander Bălănescu (born 1954), violinist
- Nicolae Bălcescu (1819–1852), soldier, historian, and journalist
- Radu Bălescu (1932–2006), Romanian and Belgian scientist
- Irina-Camelia Begu (born 1990), tennis player
- Alexandra Bellow (1935–2025), mathematician
- Joana Benedek (born 1972), Romanian-Mexican actress
- Marthe Bibesco (1886–1973), Romanian-French writer, socialite, and political hostess
- Andreea Bibiri (born 1975), actress
- Ingrid Bisu (born 1987), actress
- Claudiu Bleonț (born 1959), actor
- Lucian Boia (born 1944), historian
- Cezar Bolliac (1813–1881), archaeologist, journalist, and poet
- Dan Bordeianu (born 1975), actor
- Mircea Bornescu (born 1980), footballer
- Constantin Bosianu (1815–1882), jurist and politician
- Ana Maria Brânză (born 1984), épée fencer
- Vintilă Brătianu (1867–1930), construction engineer, mayor of Bucharest and Prime Minister of Romania
- Emilian Bratu (1904–1991), chemical engineer
- Florin Bratu (born 1980), footballer
- Roxana Briban (1971–2010), operatic soprano
- Silviu Brucan (1916–2006), communist politician
- Dionis Bubani (1926–2006), Albanian writer, playwright, humorist, and translator
- Dragoș Bucur (born 1977), actor
- Gheorghe Bucur (born 1980), football player
- Doina Bumbea (1950–1997), artist and abductee in North Korea

== C ==
- Saint Callinicus of Cernica, bishop
- Alexandra Cadanțu (born 1990), tennis player
- Nicolae Cajal (1919–2004), Jewish physician, academic, politician and philanthropist
- Rukmini Maria Callimachi (born 1973), Romanian-American journalist and poet
- Christian Calson (born 1975), Romanian-American independent filmmaker
- Constantin Cantacuzino (1905–1958), aviator
- Catherine Caradja (1893–1993), aristocrat and philanthropist
- Costache Caragiale (1815–1877), actor and theatre manager
- Mateiu Caragiale (1885–1936), poet and prose writer
- Toma Caragiu (1925–1977), theatre, television and film actor
- Ion Caramitru (1942–2021), stage and film actor
- Nae Caranfil (born 1960), film director and screenwriter
- Barbu Catargiu (1807–1862), politician and journalist
- Paul Cazan (born 1951), football player
- Vera Călin (1921–2013), Romanian-American literary critic, essayist and translator
- George Călinescu (1899–1965), literary critic, historian, novelist and journalist
- Ion I. Câmpineanu (1841–1888), politician, mayor of Bucharest and the first head of the National Bank of Romania
- Gabriel Cânu (born 1981), footballer
- Mircea Cărtărescu (born 1956), poet, novelist and essayist
- Nicu Ceaușescu (1951–1996), the youngest child of Romanian leader Nicolae and Elena Ceaușescu
- Remus Cernea (born 1974), activist
- Nicole Cherry (born 1998), singer
- Hristu Chiacu (born 1986), footballer
- Maia Ciobanu (born 1952), composer and music educator
- Victor Ciocâltea (1932–1983), chess master
- Ecaterina Ciorănescu-Nenițescu (1909–2000), chemist
- Liviu Ciulei (1923–2011), theater and film director, film writer, actor, architect, educator, costume, and set designer
- Henri Coandă (1886–1972), inventor, aerodynamics pioneer, and builder of an experimental aircraft
- Alina Cojocaru (born 1981), ballet dancer
- Dragoș Coman (born 1980), swimmer
- Sergiu Comissiona (1928–2005), Romanian-Israeli-American conductor and violinist
- Corneliu Coposu (1914–1995), politician and communist detainee
- Grigore C. Crăiniceanu (1852–1935), military officer, War Minister, and member of the Romanian Academy
- Michael Cretu (born 1957), Romanian–German musician
- Sergiu Cunescu (1923–2005), social democratic politician

== D ==
- Horia Damian (1922–2012), painter and sculptor
- Alexandru Darie (1959–2019), theater director
- Cella Delavrancea (1887–1991), pianist, writer, and teacher of piano
- Henrieta Delavrancea (1897–1987), architect
- Lucia Demetrius (1910–1992), novelist, poet, playwright, and translator
- Cristian Diaconescu (born 1959), jurist and politician
- Gheorghe Dinică (1934–2009), actor
- Neagu Djuvara (1916–2018), historian, essayist, philosopher, journalist, novelist, and diplomat
- Dora d'Istria (1828–1888), Wallachian-born Romantic writer and feminist of Albanian descent
- Ion G. Duca (1879–1933), prime minister of Romania (1933)
- Florea Dumitrache (1948–2007), football player and twice winner of the Romanian Footballer of the Year award
- Georges Dumitresco (1922–2008), doctor, poet and artist

== E ==
- Mircea Eliade (1907–1986), historian of religion, fiction writer, and philosopher
- David Emmanuel (1854–1941), mathematician, member of the Romanian Academy

== F ==
- Ștefan Fălcoianu (1835–1905), army general who served as Chief of the Romanian General Staff and War Minister
- Nicolae Filimon (1819–1865), novelist and short-story writer
- Nicolae Filipescu (1862–1916), politician, mayor of Bucharest
- Răzvan Fodor (born 1975), singer and actor

== G ==
- Grigore Gafencu (1892–1957), politician, diplomat and journalist
- Moses Gaster (1856–1939), Romanian-born Jewish-British scholar and a Hebrew linguist
- Cristian Gațu (b. 1945), former handball player, twice winner of the World Championship with Romania and twice winner of the European Champions Cup with Steaua București
- Alex Geana (born 1979), Romanian-American photographer and writer
- Mircea Geoană (born 1958), politician
- Dudu Georgescu (b. 1950), football player and twice winner of the European Golden Shoe
- Haralamb H. Georgescu (1908–1977), modernist architect
- Spiridon Georgescu (1887–1974), sculptor
- Florin Gheorghiu (born 1944), chess player
- Dimitrie Ghica (1816–1897), army officer, police prefect, politician, mayor of Bucharest and Prime Minister of Romania
- Ion Ghica (1816–1897), revolutionary, mathematician, diplomat and politician
- Alexandru Ghika (1902–1964), mathematician
- Dinu C. Giurescu (1927–2018), historian and politician, son of Constantin C. Giurescu
- Alexandru G. Golescu (1819–1881), politician
- Gheorghe Gruia (1940–2015), handball player and twice world champion, named Greatest Handball Player of All Time by the International Handball Federation (IHF)

== H ==
- Clara Haskil (1895–1960), classical pianist
- Nicolae Herlea (1927–2014), opera singer, baritone
- Dragomir Hurmuzescu (1865–1954), physicist and inventor
- John Houseman (1902–1988), Romanian-born British-American actor and film producer
- Nicolae Haralambie (1835-1908), soldier and politician

== I ==
- Andrei Iancu (born 1968), Romanian-American engineer and intellectual property attorney
- Andrew Ilie (born 1976), tennis player
- Cristina Ionda, actress
- Cassius Ionescu-Tulcea (1923–2021), mathematician
- Andrei Ioniță (born 1994), cellist
- Anghel Iordănescu (born 1950), footballer and manager of the national football team
- Edward Iordănescu (born 1978), football manager and former player
- Diana Iovanovici Șoșoacă (born 1975), Romanian lawyer and politician
- Iosif Iser (1881–1958), painter and graphic artist
- Petre Ispirescu (1830–1887), folklorist and publicist
- Nora Iuga (born 1931), poet, writer, and translator

== J ==
- Marcel Janco (1895–1984), Romanian and Israeli visual artist, architect and art theorist

== K ==
- Ioan Kalinderu (1840–1913), law professor, writer, silviculturist, confidant of King Carol I and head of the Romanian Academy
- Karmen (born 1997), singer
- Marin Karmitz (born 1938), French businessman
- Sergiu Klainerman (born 1950), mathematician
- Franz Kneisel (1865–1926), Romanian-American violinist
- Alex Kozinski (born 1950), judge on the United States Court of Appeals for the Ninth Circuit
- Nicolae Kretzulescu (1812–1900), medical doctor and politician, second Prime Minister of Romania following the assassination of Barbu Catargiu; one of the first presidents of the Romanian Academy

== L ==
- Traian Lalescu (1882–1929), mathematician
- Alexandra Maria Lara (born 1978), Romanian-born German actress
- Dinu Lipatti (1917–1950), classical pianist and composer
- Monica Lovinescu (1923–2008), essayist, short story writer, literary critic, translator and journalist
- Gherasim Luca (1913–1994), Surrealist theorist and poet
- Mircea Lucescu (b. 1945), former football player and coach

== M ==
- Alexandru Macedonski (1854–1920), poet, novelist, dramatist and literary critic
- Aureliu Manea (1945–2014), theatre director, actor, and writer
- Roxana Maracineanu (born 1975), Romanian-born French backstroke swimmer
- Gheorghe Marinescu (1863–1938), neurologist
- Draga Olteanu Matei (1933–2020), film and stage actress
- Cezar Mateus (born 1961), Romanian-American luthier
- Ion Gheorghe Maurer (1902–2000), communist politician and lawyer
- Preda Mihăilescu (born 1955), mathematician
- Ion Minulescu (1881–1944), avant-garde poet, novelist, short story writer, journalist and playwright
- Octavian Morariu (b. 1961), President of Rugby Europe
- Jacob L. Moreno (1889–1974), Austrian-American psychiatrist and psychosociologist, thinker and educator
- Maia Morgenstern (born 1962), film and stage actress

== N ==
- Gellu Naum (1915–2001), surrealist writer
- Adrian Năstase (born 1950), politician, Prime Minister of Romania from 2000 to 2004
- Ilie Năstase (born 1946), tennis player
- Valentin Neacșu (born 2000), footballer
- Cristina Neagu (born 1988), handball player
- Luca Niculescu (born 1971), journalist and diplomat
- Eddy Novarro (c. 1925–2003), photographer, collector and cosmopolitan

== O ==
- Alexandru Odobescu (1834–1895), archaeologist, author and politician
- Ion Oncescu (b. 1978), prolific arm wrestler, hall of famer

== P ==
- Sașa Pană (1902–1981), avant-garde poet, novelist, and short story writer
- Theodor Paleologu (b. 1973), historian, diplomat and politician, son of Alexandru Paleologu
- Cristina Pasaroiu (born 1987), soprano
- Margareta Pâslaru (b. 1943), actress and singer
- Marcel Pauker (1896–1938), communist militant
- Nicolae Paulescu (1869–1931), physiologist and politician
- Camil Petrescu (1894–1957), playwright, novelist, philosopher and poet
- Dan Petrescu (1953–2021), Romanian businessman and billionaire, one of the richest persons in Romania at the time
- Gică Petrescu (1915–2006), singer and composer
- Andrei Pleșu (born 1948), philosopher, essayist, journalist, literary and art critic
- Valentin Poénaru (born 1932), Romanian–French mathematician
- Ana Maria Popescu (b. 1984), fencer, Olympic, World and European champion, former World No. 1 in épée
- Elvira Popescu (1894–1993), Romanian-French stage and film actress and theatre director
- Petru Popescu (born 1944), Romanian-American writer, director and movie producer
- Ion Popescu-Gopo (1923–1989), graphic artist and animator
- Emanoil Protopopescu-Pake (1845–1893), law professor, police prefect and politician, mayor of Bucharest
- Cristi Puiu (born 1967), film director and screenwriter

== R ==
- Connect-R (born 1982), musician
- Victor Rebengiuc (born 1933), film and stage actor
- Lia Roberts (born 1949), politician
- Edward G. Robinson (1893–1973), Romanian-American actor
- Gideon Rodan (1934–2006), Romanian-American biochemist
- Alexandru Rosetti (1895–1990), linguist, editor, and memoirist
- C. A. Rosetti (1816–1885), writer, politician and leader of the Wallachian Revolution of 1848; the Romanian Academy was founded on his initiative.
- Leon Rotman (born 1950), sprint canoer
- Angelica Rozeanu (1921–2006), one of the most successful female table tennis players in the history of the sport

== S ==
- Răzvan Sabău (born 1977), tennis player
- Nicolae Saramandu (born 1941), Romanian linguist and philologist
- Paul Schwartz (born 1940), politician, Jewish Community president, mechanical engineer and inventor
- Alec Secăreanu (born 1984), actor
- Alina Șerban (born 1987), actress
- Serge Spitzer (1951–2012), Romanian-American artist
- Alina Stancu (born 1977), journalist and television presenter
- Saviana Stănescu (born 1967), Romanian-American poet, playwright and journalist
- Sorin Stati (1931–2008), linguist
- Simion Stoilow (1873–1961), mathematician
- Barbu Ștefănescu Delavrancea (1858–1918), writer and poet

== T ==
- Nicolae Șerban Tanașoca (1941–2017), historian and philologist
- Maria Tănase (1913–1963), singer and actress
- Toni Tecuceanu (1972–2010), comedy actor
- Cicerone Theodorescu (1908–1974), poet
- George Topîrceanu (1886–1937), poet, short story writer and humourist
- Nicolas Trifon (1949–2023), academic, editor and linguist
- Corneliu Vadim Tudor (1949-2015), politician, poet, writer, journalist, and a Member of the European Parliament
- Șerban Țițeica (1908–1985), quantum physicist
- Cristian Țopescu (1937–2018), sports commentator, journalist and politician

== U ==
- Ana Ularu (born 1985), actress and model

== V ==
- Elena Văcărescu (1864–1947), Romanian-French aristocrat writer
- Vazken I of Bucharest (1908–1994), Catholicos of the Armenian Apostolic Church (1953–1994)
- Ion Vianu (born 1934), writer and psychiatrist
- Ion Vîlcu (born 1966), software engineer, academic, administrator and diplomat
- Dan-Virgil Voiculescu (born 1949), mathematician
- Ion Vitner (1914–1991), literary critic and historian
- Cătălin Voicu (born 1965), politician
- George Vraca (1896–1964), stage and film actor
- Alexandru Vulpe (1931–2016), historian and archaeologist, member of the Romanian Academy

== W ==
- Eugen Weber (1925–2007), Romanian-born American historian
- Richard Wurmbrand (1909–2001), minister

== Z ==
- George Mihail Zamfirescu (1898–1939), prose writer and playwright
