= Marian Cozma =

Romanian handball player (1982–2009)

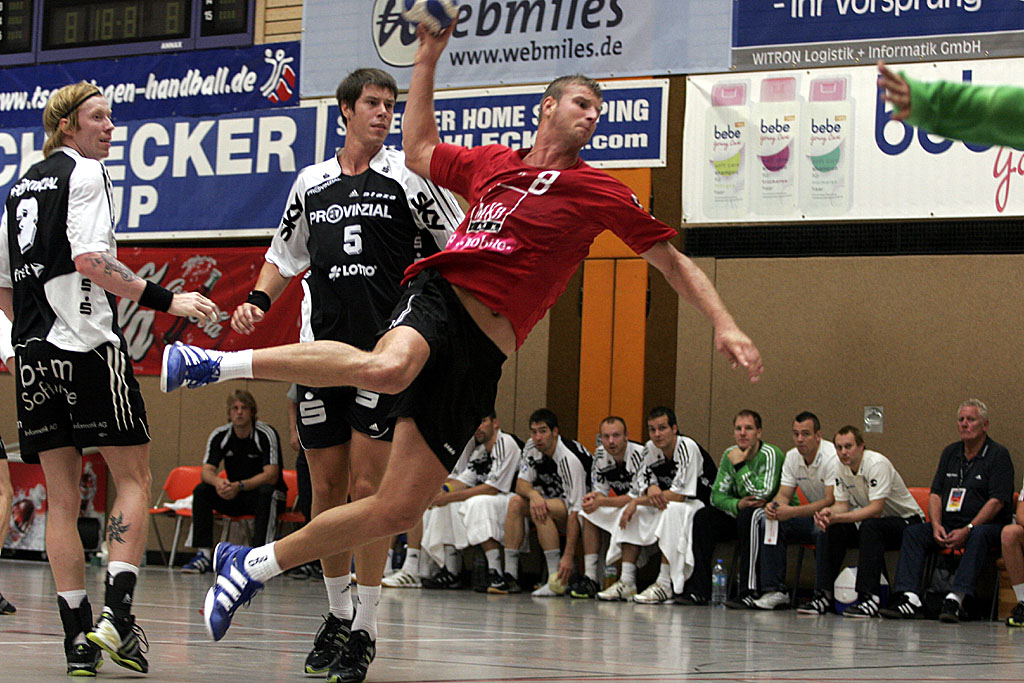

Personal information
- Full name: Marian Cozma
- Nationality: Romanian
- Born: 8 September 1982 Tei, Bucharest, Romania
- Died: 8 February 2009 (aged 26) Veszprém, Hungary
- Height: 2.11 m (6 ft 11 in)

Sport
- Sport: Handball
- Position: Pivot
- Current club: —

Senior clubs
- Years: Team
- 2002–2006: (Romania) Dinamo București
- 2006–2009: (Hungary) KC Veszprém
National team
Years	Team	Apps	(Gls)
2002–2009	Romania	60	(115)
Medal record
Men's Handball
Representing KC Veszprém
EHF Cup
Gold medal – first place	EHF Cup Winners' Cup

Marian Cozma (8 September 1982 – 8 February 2009) was a Romanian handball player. He was born in Tei, Bucharest and died in Veszprém, Hungary after being attacked and stabbed in a nightclub fight. During his career he played for HC Dinamo București and KC Veszprém and he was also a member of the Romanian national handball team.

== Career ==
Cozma began his handball career in HC Dinamo București. His father, Petre was also a handball player, and he guided his son to the sport.

He played in the Dinamo first squad from 2002 to 2006 and won the Romanian championship with the club in the 2004–2005 season.

During his time at Dinamo, Cozma was once attacked and stabbed near his house by a group of fanatic supporters of a rival team. "They asked me if I'm Cozma from Dinamo and then one of them stabbed me in the back", he said. He got an 8 centimeters long and 3 centimeters deep wound near the spine, but he recovered and was back on the playing field shortly afterwards.

In 2006, he was transferred to MKB Veszprém. With his new team he participated in the EHF Champions League in the 2006–2007 season, scoring 17 goals in the tournament. In 2008, they won the Hungarian championship and also the EHF Cup Winners' Cup defeating Rhein-Neckar Löwen in the final.

At the time of his death, Cozma was allegedly in talks with several major handball clubs in Spain, including FC Barcelona. A few days before his death, he resigned from further participation in the Romanian national team after not getting enough opportunity to play on the 2009 World Men's Handball Championship from the federal captain, and it was mentioned that he might apply for Hungarian citizenship and play for Hungary in the future.

== Death ==
Cozma died on 8 February 2009 after a stabbing attack that happened in a bar in Veszprém, Hungary. The members of KC Veszprém were celebrating the birth of the son of a player and the birthday of another, when they got into an altercation with a gang of 25-30 Romani people. Cozma was stabbed to death, while two other teammates Žarko Šešum and Ivan Pešić suffered critical injuries. As of 18 February, five people have been arrested in connection with the events.

== Legacy ==
Cozma was loved at Veszprém, on the day of his death a crowd of about 1,000 gathered in front of the town's sports arena for a torchlit vigil that was mirrored in several other towns and cities in across Hungary.

On 10 February 2009 his body has been first taken from the mortuary to the Veszprém sports hall, from where it was subsequently transferred to Szeged, the home town of KC Veszprém's greatest rivals, where the Hungarian authorities held a goodbye ceremony. Then a few hours later the convoy entered Romania and went through Nădlac, Arad, Deva, Sibiu, Braşov and Ploieşti to the applause of tens of thousands of people all the way along, before arriving to Bucharest after an 18-hour long journey. The body was placed within club Dinamo's trophy room, where supporters were able to pay their respects, from where on 13 February 2009 it was transferred to the church of the Teiul Doamnei Ghica Church for the funeral service. Approximately a thousand people attended the service including his former teammates from Veszprém and the youth and sports minister as well as the state secretary for sports of Romania. Cozma was finally laid to rest in the Pipera cemetery.

The Romanian Handball Federation Board decided that the Olympic National Center of Excellence in Sighişoara will change name to Marian Cozma. The Handball Federations of Romania and Hungary have agreed to organize an annual commemoration match between the national teams of the two countries in the memory of him, both in Veszprém and Bucharest. His #8 jersey was retired by his club KC Veszprém as well as the shirt #82 worn by him in the national team of Romania.

He was posthumously appointed honorary citizen of Veszprém, and he is also set to be awarded the title of honorary citizen of Bucharest.

He was awarded the title of emeritus master of sports by the Romanian authorities.

The Nicolae Pârâu street where he lived in Bucharest will wear his name.

The City Hall of Bucharest Sector 2 decided to give the "Distinction of honor" to Marian Cozma post-mortem.

It was decided that the sports hall of the school, number 30 "Grigore Ghica Voivode" of Lăptari Tei no. 23 in Sector 2, where he and his father enrolled, will bear the name of Marian Cozma.

Peluza sud of Dinamo stadium will wear the name of Marian Cozma.

KC Veszprém played its first match after Cozma's death on 15 February, against Ademar León in the EHF Champions League. Fans paid their tribute to Cozma with a silent march through the city before the game. The Veszprém players entered the court for team presentations in white t-shirts, with Cozma's picture on the front and his #8 on the back. Several of the fans were dressed in black, and held farewell message transparents. Veszprém went on to pull out an emotional 28–26 victory in the game.

On 24 May, KC Veszprém won the Hungarian championship after defeating SC Pick Szeged in the third game of the championship finals. Team members, wearing their white t-shirts with Cozma's picture, were led up to the medal ceremony by Petre Cozma, who was also issued a gold medal by the Hungarian handball association, which he then hanged on to a giant photo of his son.

The handball match between "U" Transilvania and HC Odorheiu Secuiesc in February 2009 was dedicated to his memory.

A movie about the murder, Szíven szúrt ország ("A Country Stabbed in the Heart") premiered on May 7, 2009 in Veszprém.

The friendly football match from 12 August 2009 between Hungary and Romania was dedicated to his memory. Journalists nationals of Hungary and Romania, along with other guests from both countries have also organized a friendly match before the senior teams, a match against violence and in memory of Marian Cozma.

On 6 February 2010 a statue of Cozma was unveiled at the Veszprém Aréna in Veszprém, from money donated by the Hungarian public.

In 2022 in an act of unprecedented sportsmanship the guest sector of Pick Aréna, home of SC Pick Szeged, Veszprém's arch rivals was named after Marian Cozma.
