= Alexandrescu =

Alexandrescu, formerly spelled Alessandrescu, is a Romanian surname. Notable people with the surname include:

- Andrei Alexandrescu (born 1969), Romanian American computer programmer
- Gheorghe-Gică Alexandrescu (1906–c. 1972), Romanian chess master
- Grigore Alexandrescu (1880–1885), Wallachian Romanian poet
- Petre Alexandrescu (1828–1889), Wallachian Romanian artist
- Sorin Alexandrescu (born 1937), Romanian semiotician
- Alexandru Talex, originally Atanase Alexandrescu (1909–1998), Romanian writer and politician
- Vasile Alexandrescu Urechia (1834–1901), Moldavian Romanian historian and politician

== See also ==
- Alexe (name)
- Alexandreni (disambiguation)
