= Alexe =

Alexe is a Romanian given name and family name that may refer to:

== Given name ==
- Alexe Dumitru (1935–1971), Romanian sprint canoer who competed in the late 1950s and early 1960s
- Alexe Gilles (born 1992). American-born Canadian figure skater
- Alexe Iacovici, Romanian sprint canoer who competed in the early 1960s
- Alexe Mateevici (1888–1917) was one of the most prominent Romanian poets in Bessarabia
- Alexe Bădărău (1922–1997), who later changed his name to Aleksi Ivanov and became a Bulgarian politician

== Surname ==
- Antonio Alexe (1969–2005), Romanian basketball player
- Dan Alexe (born 1961), Romanian journalist and filmmaker, known for his documentaries
- Florin-Alexandru Alexe (born 1979), Romanian economist and politician
- Ion Alexe (born 1946), heavyweight boxer from Romania, who won the silver medal at the 1972 Summer Olympics in Munich
- Marius Silviu Alexe (born 1990), Romanian footballer who plays as a left winger for Dinamo București

== See also ==
- Alexandreni (disambiguation)
- Alexandrescu (surname)
- Alexeni, name of several villages in Romania
