= Stancu =

Stancu is a Romanian surname. Notable people with the surname include:

- Alina Stancu (born 1977), Romanian journalist and television presenter
- Bogdan Stancu (born 1987), Romanian football player
- Constantin Romeo Stancu, Romanian football player
- Constantin Stancu (born 1956), retired Romanian football player
- Cristiana Stancu (born 1991), Romanian mixed martial artist, karateka, boxer & kickboxer
- Gheorghe Bunea Stancu (born 1954), Romanian politician
- Ionuț Cristian Stancu (born 1983), Romanian football wingback
- Mădălin Stancu (born 1992), Romanian professional footballer
- Mihai Stancu (born 1996), Romanian professional footballer
- Stelian Stancu (born 1981), Romanian football player
- Vlad Stancu (born 2005), Romanian competitive swimmer
- Zaharia Stancu (1902–1974), Romanian prose writer, novelist, poet, and philosopher
