= Alexandreni (disambiguation) =

Alexandreni may refer to:

- Alexandreni, a commune in Sîngerei district, Moldova (including a village by the same name)
- Alexandreni, a village in Edineţ district, Moldova

== See also ==
- Alexe (name)
- Alexandrescu (surname)
