= Alexandru Ghika =

Romanian mathematician (1902–1964)

- Born: June 22, 1902; Bucharest, Kingdom of Romania
- Died: April 11, 1964 (aged 61); Bucharest, Romanian People's Republic
- Resting place: Teiul Doamnei Ghica Church, Bucharest
- Education: University of Paris
- Known for: Functional analysis
- Spouse: Elisabeta Angelescu (m. 1934)
- Children: 1
- Parents: Ioan Ghika (father); Elena Metaxa (mother)
- Family: Ghica family
- Scientific career
- Fields: Mathematics
- Workplaces: University of Bucharest; Institute of Mathematics of the Romanian Academy
- Thesis: Sur les fonctions de carré sommable le long des contours de leur domaines d’holomorphisme et leur applications aux équations différentielles linéaires d’ordre infini (1929)
- Doctoral advisor: Arnaud Denjoy
- Doctoral students: Silviu Teleman; Petru Mocanu

Alexandru Ghika (June 22, 1902 – April 11, 1964) was a Romanian mathematician, founder of the Romanian school of functional analysis.

== Life ==
He was born in Bucharest, into the Ghica family, the son of Ioan Ghika (1873–1949) and Elena Metaxa (1870–1951), and great-great-grandson of Grigore IV Ghica, Prince of Wallachia. He started his secondary studies at the Gheorghe Lazăr High School in Bucharest. In 1917, he left with his family for Paris, completing his secondary studies at the Lycée Louis-le-Grand in 1920. He then entered the University of Paris (the Sorbonne) with a major in mathematics, graduating in 1922. In 1929, he obtained a Ph.D. in mathematics from the Faculté des Sciences of the University of Paris, with thesis written under the direction of Arnaud Denjoy.

After completing his doctorate, Ghika returned to Romania. In November 1932 he became assistant professor in the Mathematics Department of the University of Bucharest, working in the Function Theory section chaired by Dimitrie Pompeiu. On February 7, 1935, he was promoted to associate professor, and in 1945 he was named Full Professor and chair of the newly founded Functional Analysis section.

In 1935, Ghika was elected corresponding member of the Romania Academy of Sciences, being promoted to full member in 1938. In 1955 he became corresponding member of the Romanian Academy, and was promoted to full membership on March 20, 1963. In 1949, at the founding of the Institute of Mathematics of the Romanian Academy, he became the chair of the Functional Analysis section of that Institute, a position he held till his death.

Ghika married Elisabeta Angelescu (daughter of one-time Prime Minister Constantin Angelescu) on June 7, 1934. They had a son, Grigore (born November 7, 1936), who became a researcher at the Institute of Atomic Physics in Măgurele.

Alexandru Ghika died in Bucharest of lung cancer. He was buried at the Teiul Doamnei Ghica Church, founded in 1833 by Prince Grigore Alexandru Ghica.

In March, 2007, the heirs of the Ghika and Angelescu families won back their rights to Hotel Lido, in Bucharest.

== Legacy ==
Ghika introduced the study of functional analysis in Romania at a time when it was still a new field of mathematics. As a professor at the University of Bucharest, he was an important promoter of the Bourbaki rigorous approach to mathematics. His collected works number 103 published articles and books, 10 manuscripts, and 25 didactic works.

His research in functional analysis introduced new concepts, such as F-ordered rings (now known as Ghika rings), which have the property that in any module over a ring in this class, the analogue of the Hahn–Banach theorem holds. He is also remembered for a representation theorem for reflexive Banach spaces, now known as the Ghika–James representation theorem.

Among his doctoral students were Silviu Teleman and Petru Mocanu.

== Works ==
- Sur les fonctions de carré sommable le long des contours de leur domaines d’holomorphisme et leur applications aux équations différentielles linéaires d’ordre infini, Ph.D. thesis, Faculté des Sciences de Paris, 1929. OCLC 42822939
- On reflexive Banach spaces, Acad. Repub. Pop. Române. Bul. Ști. A. 1 (1949), 639–644. MR 0038015
- The extension of general linear functionals in semi-normed modules, Acad. Repub. Pop. Române Bul. Ști. Ser. Mat. Fiz. Chim. 2 (1950), 399–405. MR 0045319
- Analiză funcțională (Functional analysis), Editura Academiei Republicii Socialiste România, Bucharest, 1967. MR 0211242
- Opera matematică (Mathematical works), Editura Academiei Republicii Socialiste România, Bucharest, 1968. MR 0229502
