= Tei, Bucharest =

Coordinates: 44.459837°N 26.118643°E

Tei on the map of Bucharest

Tei is a neighborhood in Sector 2 of Bucharest, Romania. The name comes from the name of a lake in this area: Lacul Tei (Linden Tree Lake). The name of the lake comes from the linden woods that existed around it in the past.

At the beginning of the 19th century, the area belonged to the Ghica family, who built the Orthodox Teiul Doamnei Ghica Church (1833) and, in 1822 the Ghica Tei palace (Palatul Ghica). Around 1900, the area south of the "Calea Lacul Teiului" (today "Bulevardul Lacul Tei") had been sold to Bulgarian gardeners (called "sârbi"). After the First World War, on the grounds located north and southeast of the "Calea Lacul Teiului", houses were built. During the communist era, many apartment buildings, as well as the Technical University of Civil Engineering of Bucharest and the State Circus were built.

To this day, there are still many linden trees in the neighbourhood, and when they are in bloom, they spread a strong scent across the streets. Tei has developed in the last few years from a middle-class neighbourhood into an upper-class one, with many mansions being built recently. The neighbourhood has also become home to Ukrainian refugees.

== Images ==
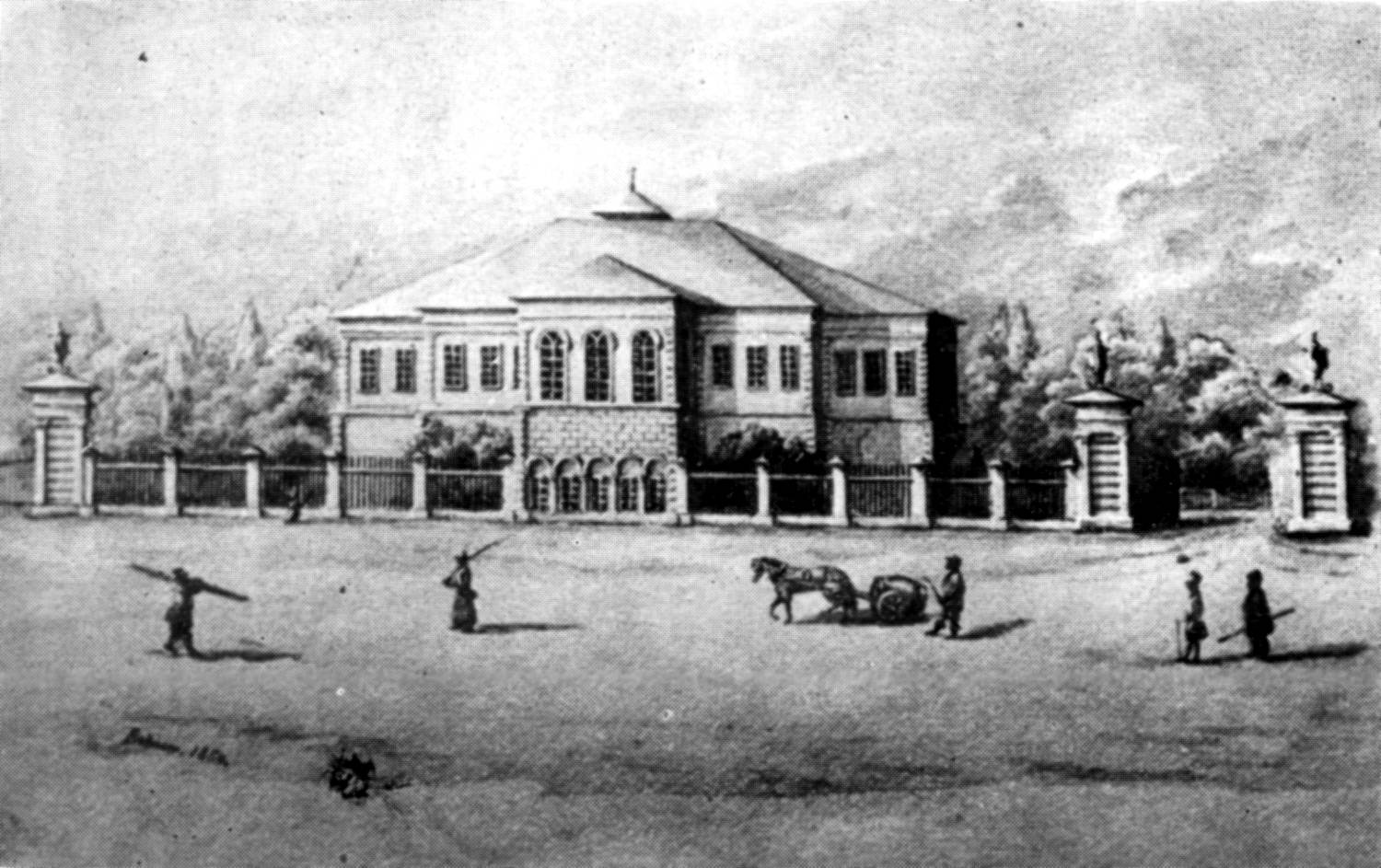
The Ghica palace 19th century

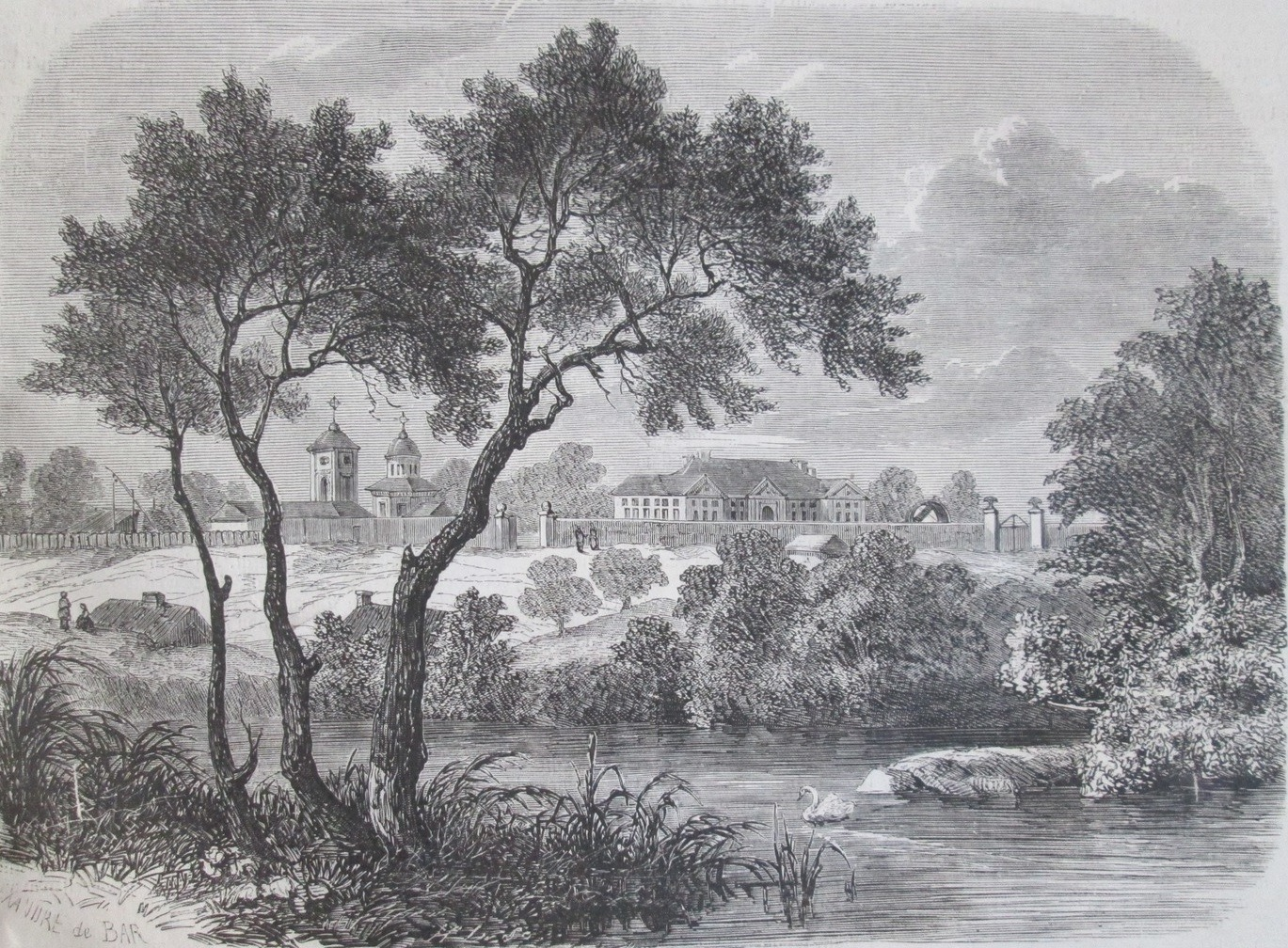
The Ghica palace and the Teiul Doamnei Ghika-church in 1859 (view from Lake Plumbuita)

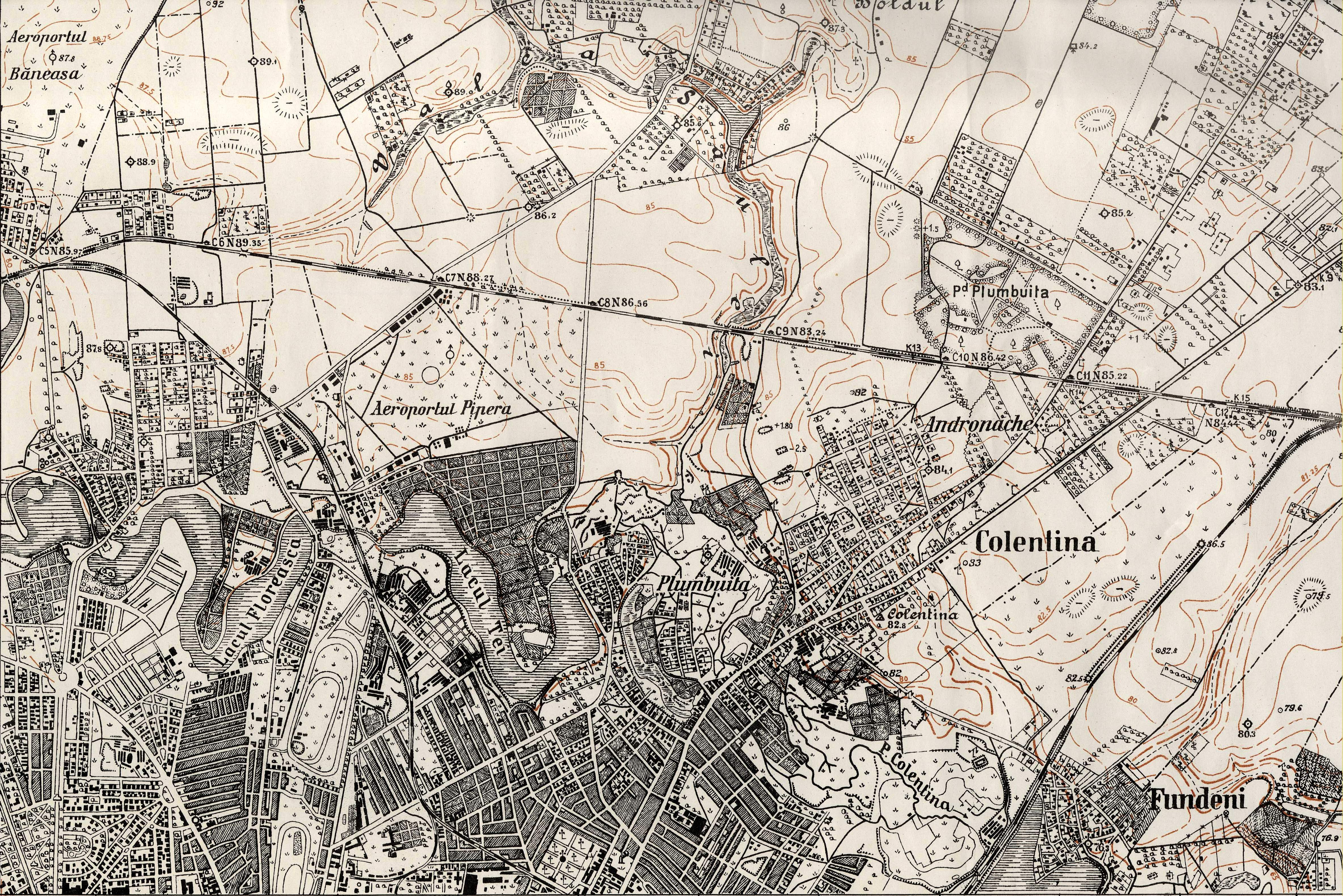
The area around Lacul Tei during the interwar period

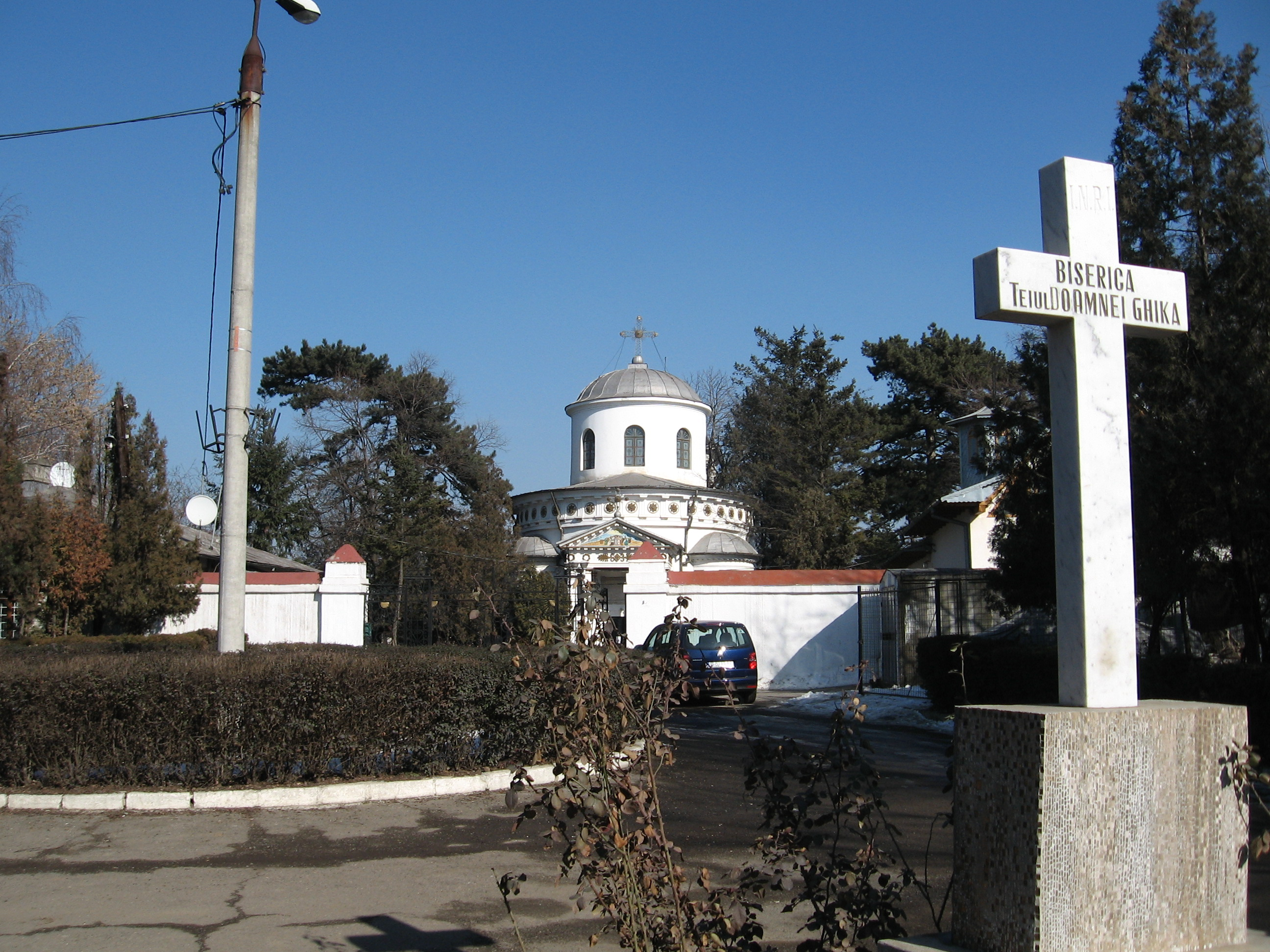
The church Teiul Doamnei Ghika today

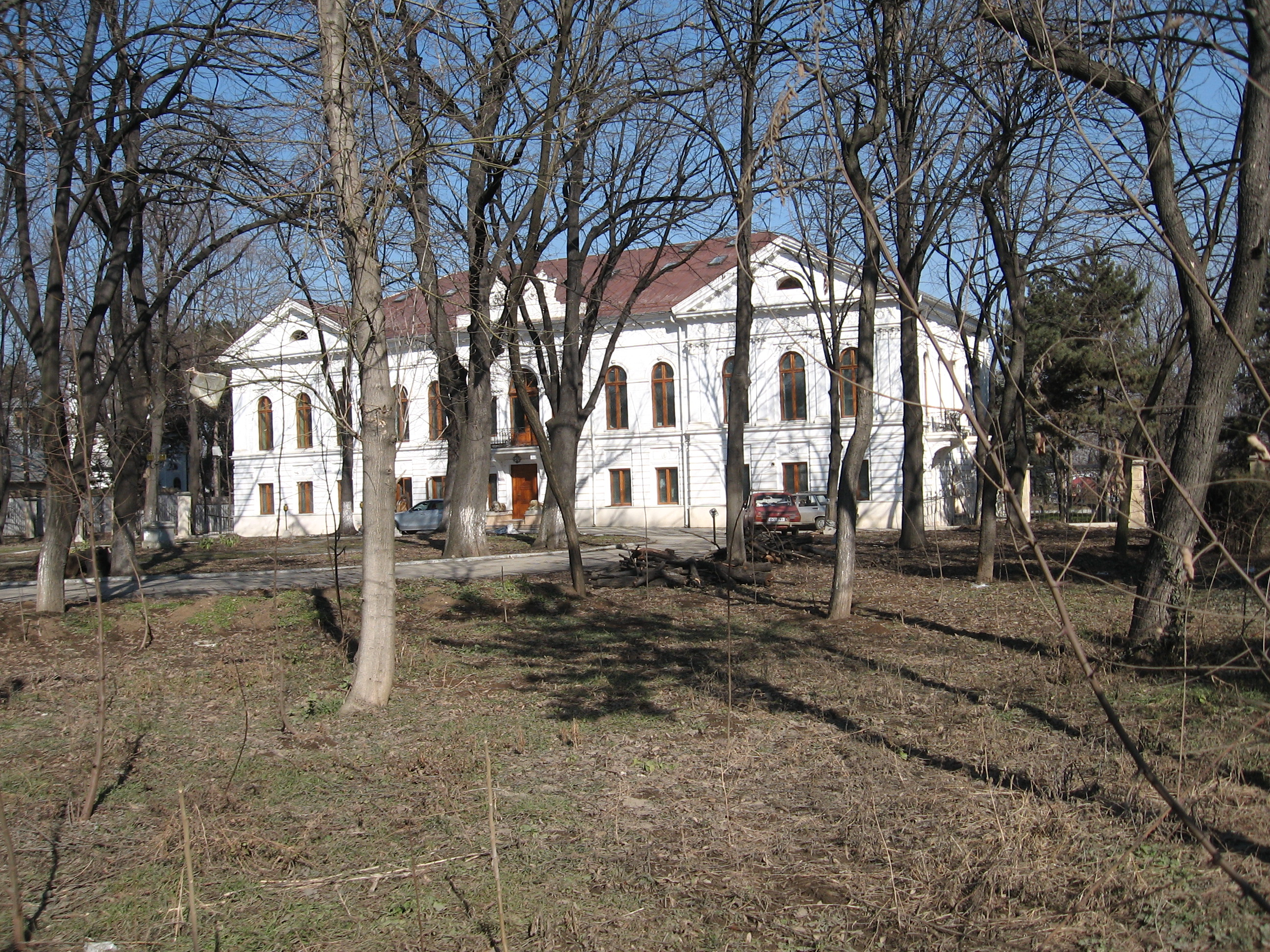
The Ghica palace today

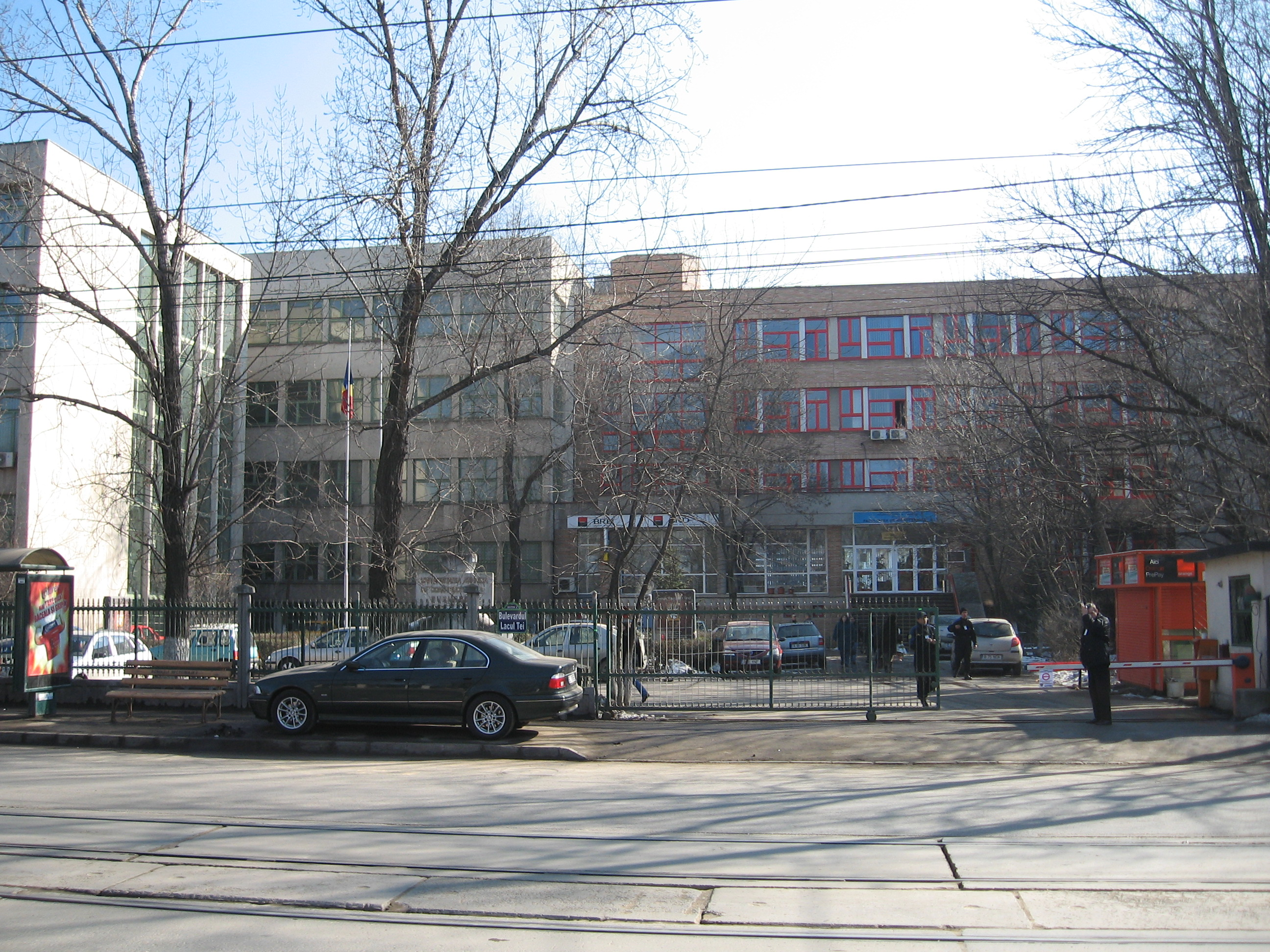
The Technical University of Civil Engineering of Bucharest

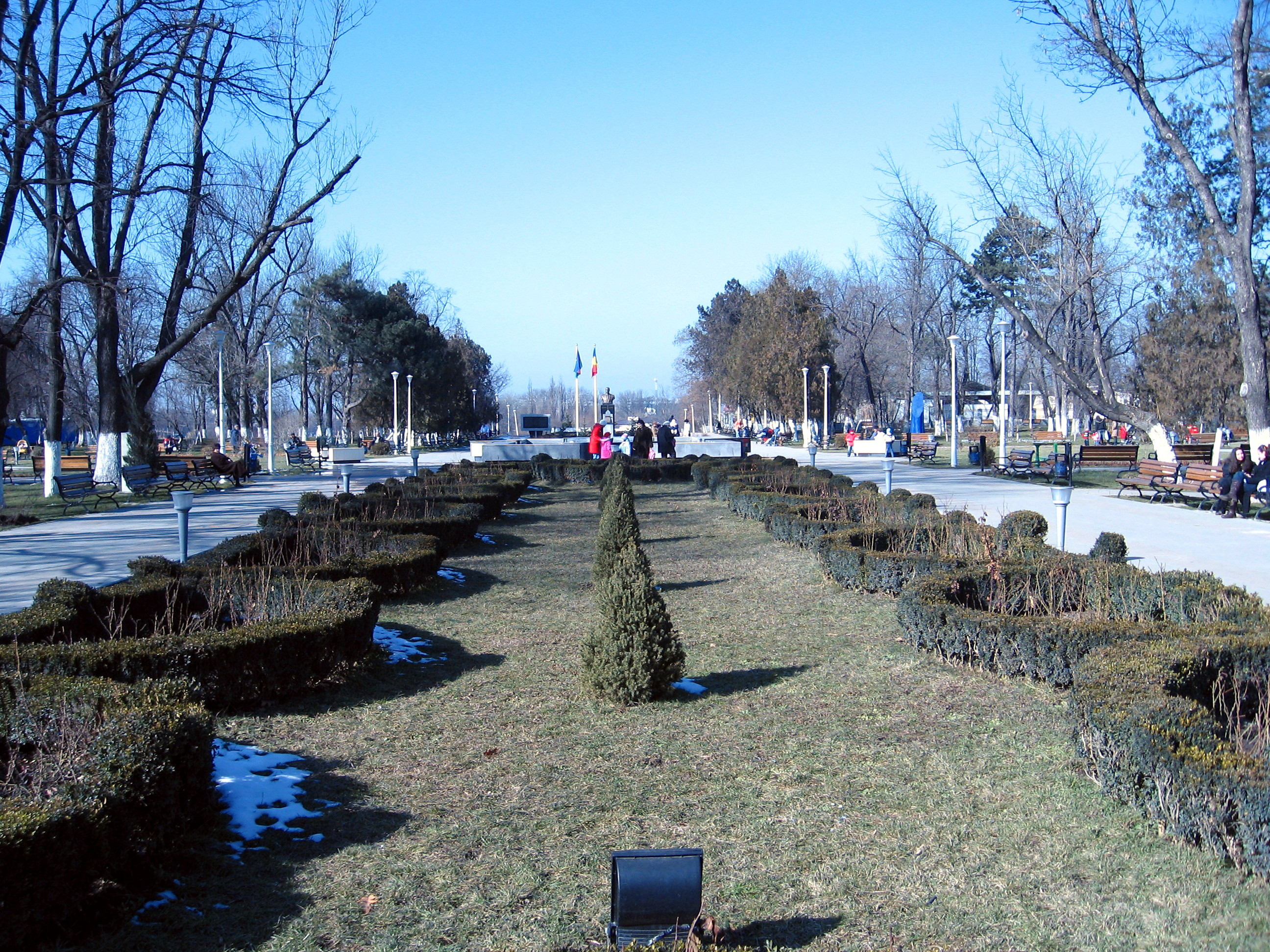
Parcul Tei (the "Linden Park")

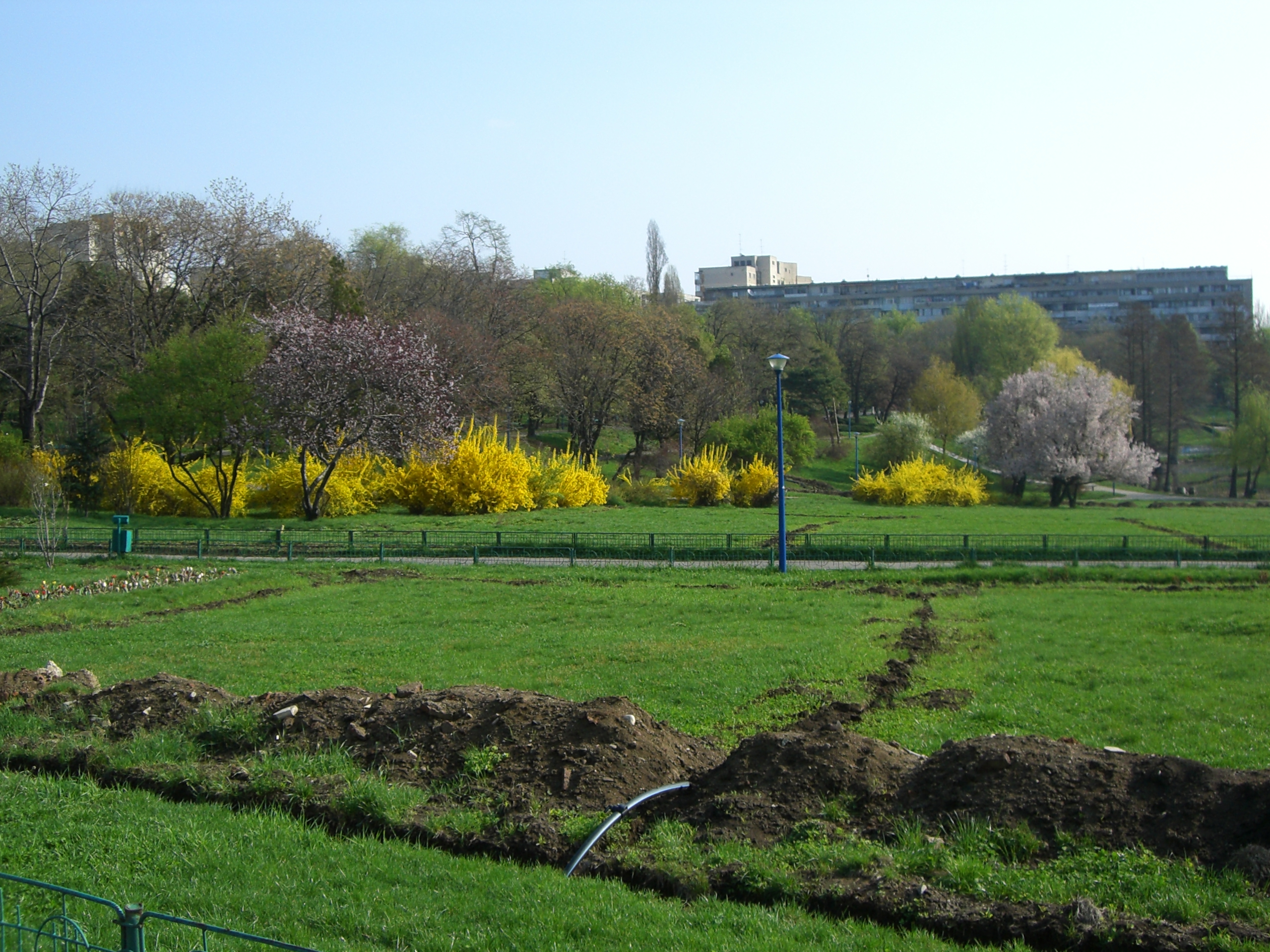
Parcul Circului (Parcul Tonola)

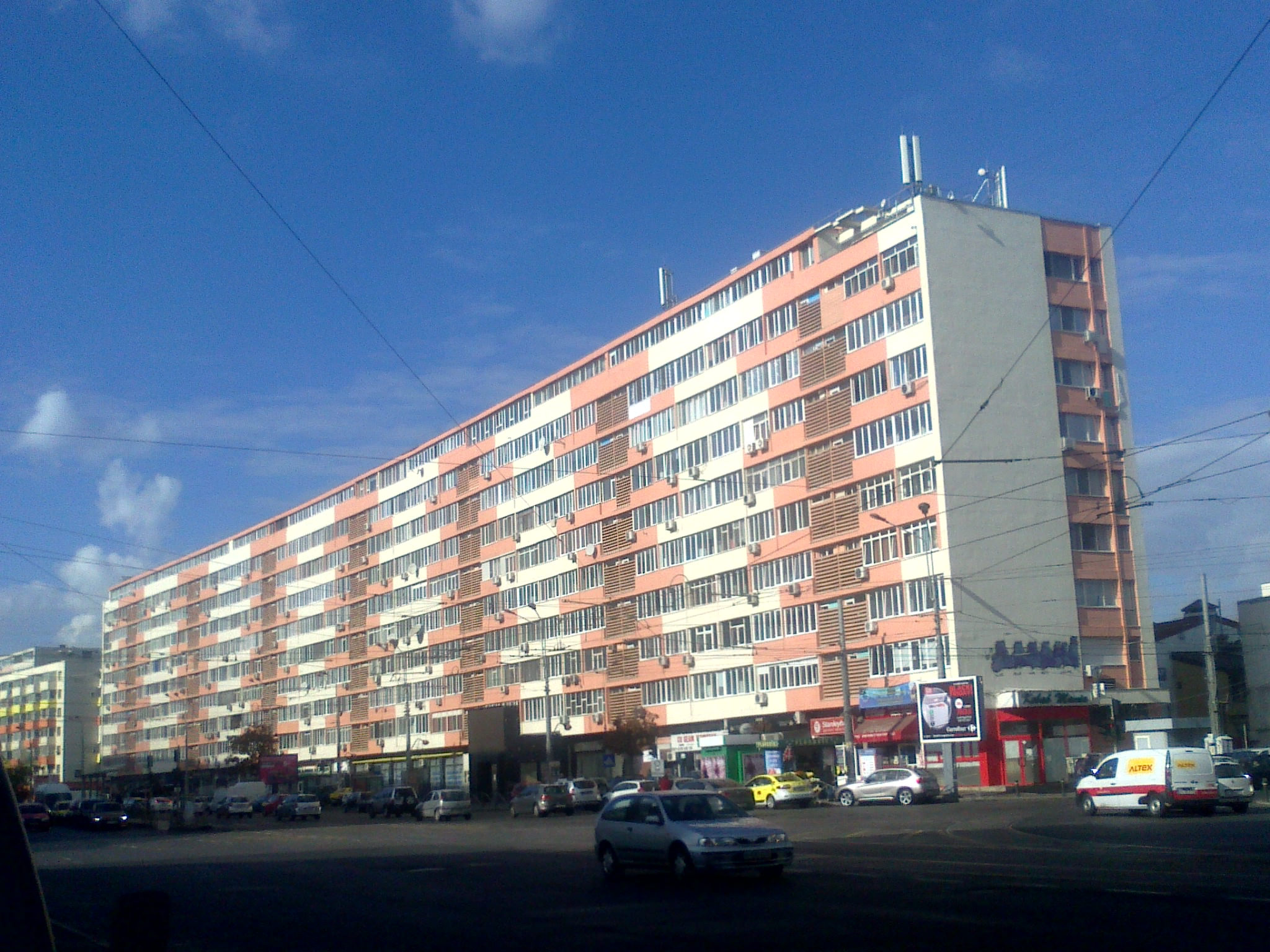
Lizeanu housing estate, built 1962
