= Bosquito =

Romanian rock band

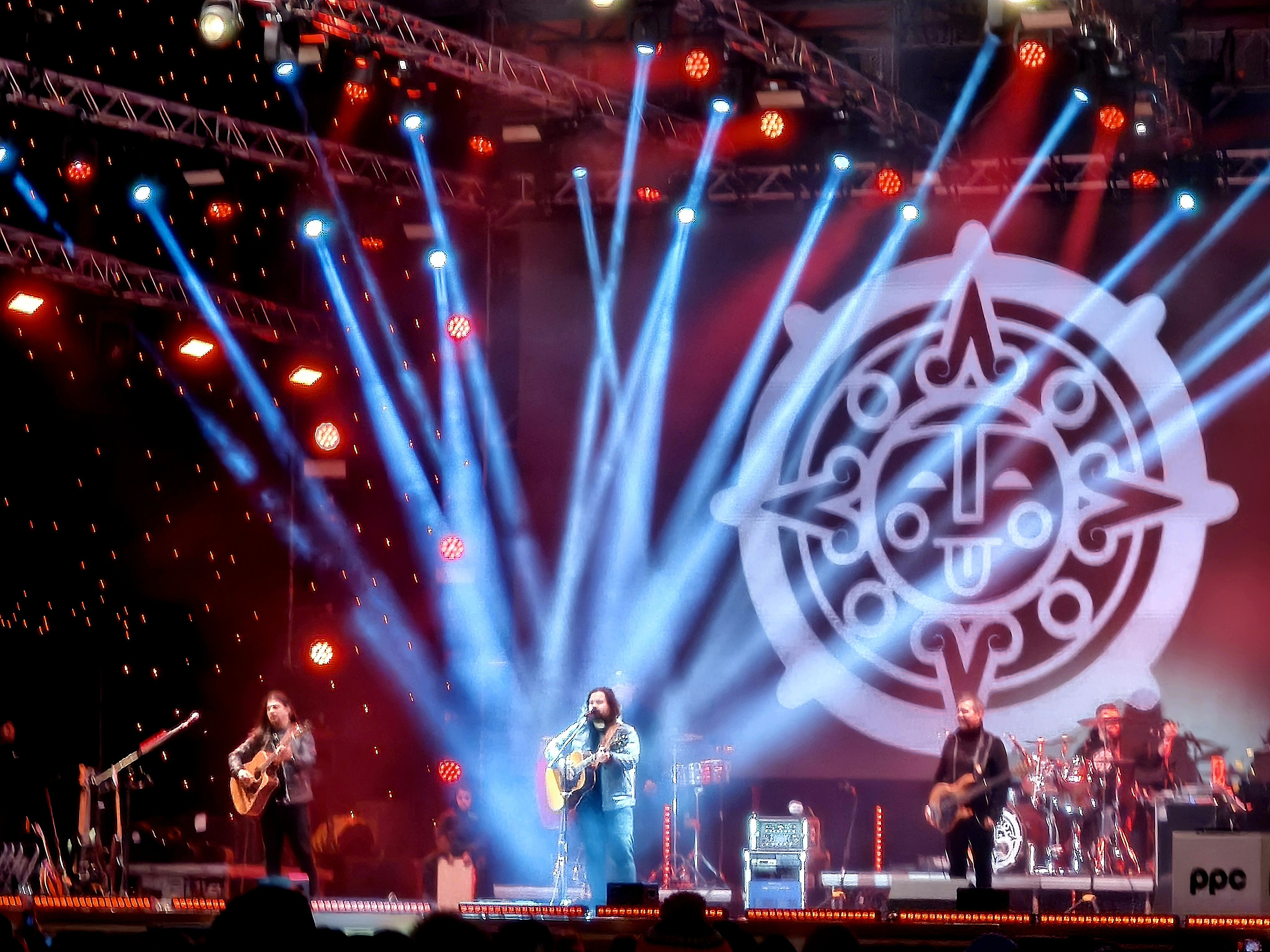
- Bosquito at the 2025 edition of Bucharest Christmas Market

Background information
- Origin: Brașov, Romania
- Genres: Alternative rock, pop rock, Latin rock, ska rock
- Years active: 1999–present
- Labels: Roton
- Members: Radu Almășan; Ciprian Pascal; Dorin Țapu; Mircea "Burete" Preda

Bosquito (Pronunciation: ʙᴏsᴋɪːᴛᴏ) is a Romanian rock band formed in Brașov in 1999. The group's current line-up consists of vocalist/guitarist Radu Almășan, drummer Dorin Țapu, guitarist Ciprian Pascal, and bassist Mircea "Burete" Preda. The band is well-known for infusing their songs with diverse influences, including Gypsy music, Latin, Balkan, punk, and elements of symphonic music. The group has released 5 albums to date with several top-charting singles including "Pepita", "Marcela", "Bosquito", "Hopa Hopa", and the ballad "Două Mâini", which reached #1 in the Romanian Top 100, remaining one of the most celebrated love songs in Romanian music. In 2005, the band entered a hiatus on the Romanian market while relocating to the United States; the original line-up disbanded shortly thereafter. In 2011, Radu Almășan made a comeback as Bosquito with a brand-new line-up, launching their first single in 6 years: "Când Îngerii Pleacă", as well as releasing a new album, Babylon, in 2014.

== History ==
=== Early days and debut album, Bosquito (1999–2001) ===
Bosquito was formed in Brașov at the initiative of singer Radu Almășan, who dropped out of college in his freshman year to completely dedicate himself to the new band. The first line-up consisted of Victor "Solo" Solomon on guitar, Victor "Vichi" Stephanovici on bass, Mișu Constantinescu on keyboards, and Darius Neagu on drums. Their first demo, containing an early version of the song "Spune Da!" (a song that would later be included on their self-titled debut album), was pitched to MediaPro Music.

The label requested a second demo, which included an early version of "Pas cu Pas", a song that would go on to become their first single and music video. By May 2000, Bosquito played their first show at the Propaganda Pro FM festival, the biggest concert in Romania at the time. They were subsequently signed to Mediapro Music. Their self-titled debut album was recorded in Bucharest and released on September 1, 2000.

Two singles were released from this album: "Pas cu Pas", released concomitantly with the album on September 1, and "Țigano", released in the spring of 2001. The singles propelled Bosquito into the Romanian touring circuit, with rotation on music television channels, but not on radio. The band became a live phenomenon, increasing their fanbase through extensive touring. Numerous Romanian music publications regarded the band as the best new live act of 2001. The song "Pas cu Pas" was included on MediaPro's "A Fost Vara Ispitelor", a compilation of that year's best songs.

=== Sar Scântei and Cocktail Molotov (2001–2003) ===
Following the positive reaction of the self-titled debut album, Bosquito began working on new material in the summer of 2001.

They recorded and filmed the music video for their next single, "Pepita", a Romanian-language cover of a Mexican folk song that Radu used to sing during his childhood. The song was their first radio hit and the rotation of the music video on Pro TV would make the band popular all over Romania. Pepita was to be included on the band's next album, Sar Scântei, released on June 9, 2002.

The album spawned two more singles, accompanied by music videos, that were released to popular and critical acclaim. First, the balkanic-influenced "Hopa Hopa", followed by "Două Mâini", a love song that would represent Bosquito's commercial peak to date. "Două Mâini" became #1 on the Romanian Top 100, has since become a staple for the band's live performances, and remains one of the most celebrated Romanian love songs. By 2003, the band began considering an international career with a move to the United States. Under these circumstances, drummer Darius Neagu would decide to leave the band, being replaced by Radu Buzac. Due to their dissatisfaction regarding the audio quality of a few songs on the debut album, the band decided to re-record some of them, plus 3 bonus covers ("Patience" by Guns N' Roses, "Gitano" by Santana — renamed "Gosa Como Yo" for the album, and "Soldier Of Fortune" by Deep Purple).

Bosquito recorded their first song in English, "Running From You", and decided to release a compilation that included the re-recorded songs, the covers, and the new song. The compilation was named Cocktail Molotov and was released in October 2003. The single from this album "Bosquito" received significant airplay on national radio and TV stations. A few weeks before the album's release, the band suffered another line-up change, with Radu Buzac being replaced by Andrei Cebotari. In a later interview for Formula AS, lead singer Radu Almășan stated that the band would rather have a rock drummer than a jazz-trained one such as Buzac.

The band felt that Andrei Cebotari, former drummer of Zdob și Zdub, integrated much better with its musical direction. At this time, the group decided to also include percussionist Mario Apostol, a long-time collaborator, as an official member. In February 2003, at a ceremony held at the Sică Alexandrescu Theatre in Brașov, Bosquito received the "Brașoveanul Anului" ("Person of the Year") award, voted by the readers of Monitorul Expres. The award was presented by the then vice mayor of Brașov, George Scripcaru (later the city's mayor). Bosquito concluded the ceremony with a concert.

=== Fărâme Din Soare (2004–2005) ===
Following numerous concerts in the previous year, the band decided to take a break from touring and rented a cabin in the mountains where they would spend the month of January 2004, solely focusing on writing for the next album. Upon returning and discovering that MediaPro's managerial staff had been completely changed by the owners and feeling insecure with the label's new direction, Bosquito decided to leave MediaPro and signed a new record deal with Cat Music/Media Services. In the spring of 2004, Radu Almășan, the band's main composer, signed the band's catalogue to EMI Publishing. Subsequently, the band started recording the new album in Bucharest and decided to title it Fărâme Din Soare.

The album was released in August 2004, with the first single, "Marcela", being a bold change of style, including elements of punk. The song was largely ignored by the majority of radio stations but became a fan favorite and live staple. The next single and music video was "Tu Ești Iubita Mea", a song that would have considerably greater airplay. The band continued to tour extensively, being voted by music lovers of Romania as the "Best Live Act" of 2004.

=== America, rift and dissension between members (2005–2010) ===
In the beginning of 2005, after years of preparation, the band decides to relocate to the United States. Following that, Mario Apostol and Mișu Constantinescu part with the band. Being a four-piece for the first time, the band flies to Los Angeles on March 16. Two days before their departure, the remaining members shot a music video for their single "După Furtună". In Los Angeles, they decided to perform under the pseudonym "Acoustic Bullet" upon being advised that the name "Bosquito" might be less suited for the American audience.

They started touring clubs in the Los Angeles area, such as The Viper Room, The Hard Rock Cafe, The Knitting Factory, and the House of Blues. Shortly after recording a demo in English, tensions between members began to rise, leading Victor Solomon and Vichi Stephanovici to return to Romania and leave the band. Radu Almășan and Andrei Cebotari would decide to carry on in America.

However, due to visa limitations, they would return to Romania for the summer of 2005, touring with Victor Solomon and bassist Adrian Ciuplea as collaborators. In December 2005, Radu and Andrei left again to focus on their newly formed indie rock band, Madame Hooligan, leaving Bosquito on an indefinite hiatus in Romania while still performing sporadic concerts in the United States under various temporary line-ups.

=== Return to Romania with new line-up (2010–2014) ===
In 2010, Radu Almășan visited Romania for the first time in 5 years. During this time, he responded to an invitation to appear on Pro TV's Happy Hour talk show, and, instead of showcasing old material as requested by the producers, wrote a new song, "Tobogan", for the occasion. Radu, accompanied by percussionist Felix Mircea Moldovan, premiered "Tobogan" during the show on June 30. Due to the overwhelmingly positive response to the song and contractual obligations for Madame Hooligan that would keep him performing in Romania for the next two years, Radu decided to reform Bosquito with a different line-up and make a comeback for the Romanian audience.

At this time, longtime partner Andrei Cebotari opted to return to Moldova for family reasons, eventually rejoining with his former band, Zdob și Zdub. In August, Radu Almășan signed a new, three-year record deal with Roton. Upon deciding to give a shot to younger collaborators, Radu started performing with Ciprian Pascal on guitar, Dorin Țapu on bass, and Felix Mircea Moldovan on drums. Their first concert as Bosquito took place in Piatra Neamț, on November 5, 2010. Due to touring with Madame Hooligan in the first part of 2011, Bosquito started regularly performing and preparing a comeback single only in the last part of that year. A notable exception is their Bucharest concert at Piața Constituției, where they opened for Shakira in front of 20,000 people as part of The Sun Comes Out World Tour.

The song "Când Îngerii Pleacă" was recorded with Dorin Țapu switching to drums and Austin Jesse Mitchell from Madame Hooligan playing bass. This situation, initially seen as a compromise for Felix Mircea Moldovan's prior engagements and inability to attend the sessions, finally led to Pascal, Țapu, and Mitchell being included in the band as official members. The band premiered their new song live with a special concert at "Garajul Europa FM" on August 4, 2011. Following a positive response from fans and press, a music video was filmed and the song officially debuted on radio Europa FM on November 16. A period of touring followed in order to present the new songs and line-up to the fans.

At the beginning of 2012, Bosquito began collaborating with drummer Ovidiu Lipan Ţăndărică, famed for his work with Phoenix. This resulted in a new single and music video, "Întuneric în Culori", as well as nationwide concerts featuring both artists following the single's release in August. As of summer 2012, the band had begun recording its first album since 2004. In December 2012, MTV featured Bosquito in its MTV Unplugged series. Two songs from the upcoming album were premiered on television during the Unplugged concert: "București" and "Omule Perete". The performance also featured Mariano Castro, pianist of Narcotango, former member Mario Apostol, and a string quartet.

In autumn of 2013, Bosquito performed a major concert at the historic Cinema Patria in Bucharest to great success, and followed the concert with a summer tour through all of the most popular Black Sea tourist destinations including Jupiter and Vama Veche.

=== Babylon (2014–present) ===
In September 2014, Bosquito released an album consisting of recordings made during their comeback period, which began in 2010, along with several new, never-heard-before songs. The album was heavily promoted during the band's 2014 summer tour with the single "Prieteni" and was followed by a major concert at the landmark Cinema Patria in Bucharest on November 10, 2014.

== Members ==
Official members:

- Radu Almășan – lead vocals, acoustic guitar, electric guitar;
- Ciprian Pascal – electric guitar, acoustic guitar, mandolin, backup vocals;
- Mircea "Burete" Preda – bass guitar;
- Dorin Țapu – drums, electric guitar, twelve-string guitar.

Live band collaborators:

- Mariano Castro – keyboards, piano;
- Harvis Padron – trumpet;
- Mădălina Penciu – viola;
- Cristina Pasa – violin;
- Diana Jipa – violin;
- Violeta Tuta-Popescu – cello;
- Gilberto Ortega – percussion.

== Discography ==
=== Studio albums ===
- 2000: Bosquito
- 2002: Sar Scântei
- 2003: Cocktail Molotov
- 2004: Fărâme Din Soare
- 2014: Babylon
- 2019: Sus

=== Singles & Music videos ===
| Year | Name | Video description | Genre |
|---|---|---|---|
| 2000 | «Pas cu Pas» | | |
| 2001 | «Hopa Hopa» | | Pop rock |
| 2001 | «Două Mâini» | In the video, the band plays in a room while the relationship between two lovers is shown. | Alternative rock, pop rock |
| 2002 | «Pepita» | In the video, musicians play in a Gypsy camp near the house of a woman who is watching from her balcony, pouring water on them, and also rejoices inside the room. At the end of the video, the woman goes down and the singer invites her to dance. | Latin rock |
| 2002 | «Țigano» | The video was filmed with the effect of black-and-white in a hotel. It tells the story of a failed love between a man and a woman, who ("presumably") is engaged in sex for money. | Rock |
| 2003 | «Bosquito» | | |
| 2004 | «Tu Ești Iubita Mea» | The video shows footage of memories from the love story of a young family, in which the woman died. In the end, Radu Almășan places flowers on her grave. | Alternative rock, post-grunge |
| 2004 | «Marcela» | The action takes place at the home of the singer’s girlfriend, where he has invited guests and enjoys their company. The meaning of the video is intertwined with the lyrics, which describe the vocalist going crazy while waiting for the girl and deciding to have fun. | Latin rock, post-grunge |
| 2011 | «Când Îngerii Pleacă» | | Alternative rock, piano rock |
| 2012 | «Întuneric în culori» (feat. Ovidiu Lipan Țăndărică) | | Alternative rock |
| 2014 | «Prieteni» | | |
