= Petre Alexandrescu =

Romanian painter

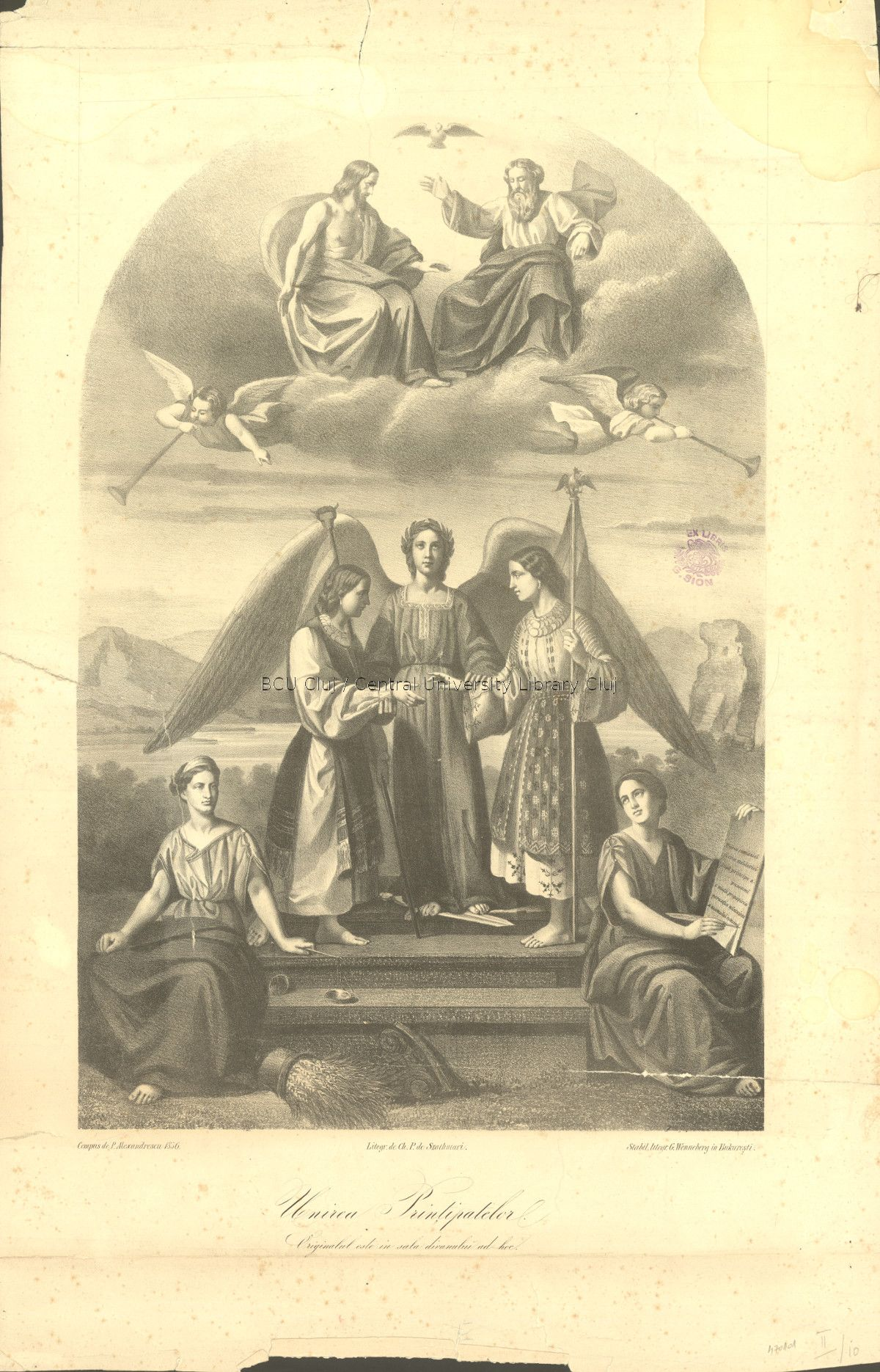
The Union of Principalities

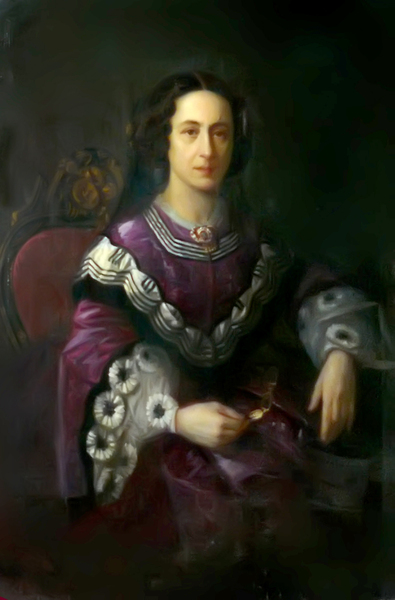
Portrait of Mrs. Hagiad

Petre Alexandrescu (1828, Bucharest – 18 July 1899, Brăila) was a Romanian painter and lithographer.

== Biography ==
Although Bucharest is generally cited as his birthplace, he may have been born in Craiova. Having displayed an early aptitude for art, he was already working as a drawing teacher at the age of seventeen. His talents were noted by the nobleman, Barbu Știrbei, who provided the means for him to study abroad, on the condition that he would become a teacher in the public schools.

He Initially expressed a preference for Vienna, and went there in 1851 to discuss the options that were available. After concluding that his knowledge of German was insufficient, he was advised to choose Paris or somewhere in Italy, and chose Rome. He was there from 1851 to 1856, and may have studied at the Accademia di San Luca. After that, he moved to Paris, where he was a student of Léon Cogniet. He made lithographs of some of the paintings he produced there, as well as works by Gheorghe Tattarescu. In 1859, he returned to Craiova to join his family.

In 1860, he went to Bucharest to become a drawing teacher at the Gheorghe Lazăr Gymnasium. The following year, he served on a commission to create regulations for the establishment of schools and museums. His best-known student was Ion Andreescu.

During his time there, he painted portraits, allegories and decorations for several churches. His work at the Antim Monastery attracted the attention of Dionisie Romano, the Bishop of Buzău, who commissioned him to paint portraits of himself and numerous other bishops.

In 1867, he moved from Bucharest to Brăila, gave up painting, and went into business. Several art historians have speculated on the reason for this, but nothing is known for certain.
