= Gheorghe Lazăr National College, Bucharest =

Gheorghe Lazăr National College
- Colegiul Național Gheorghe Lazăr
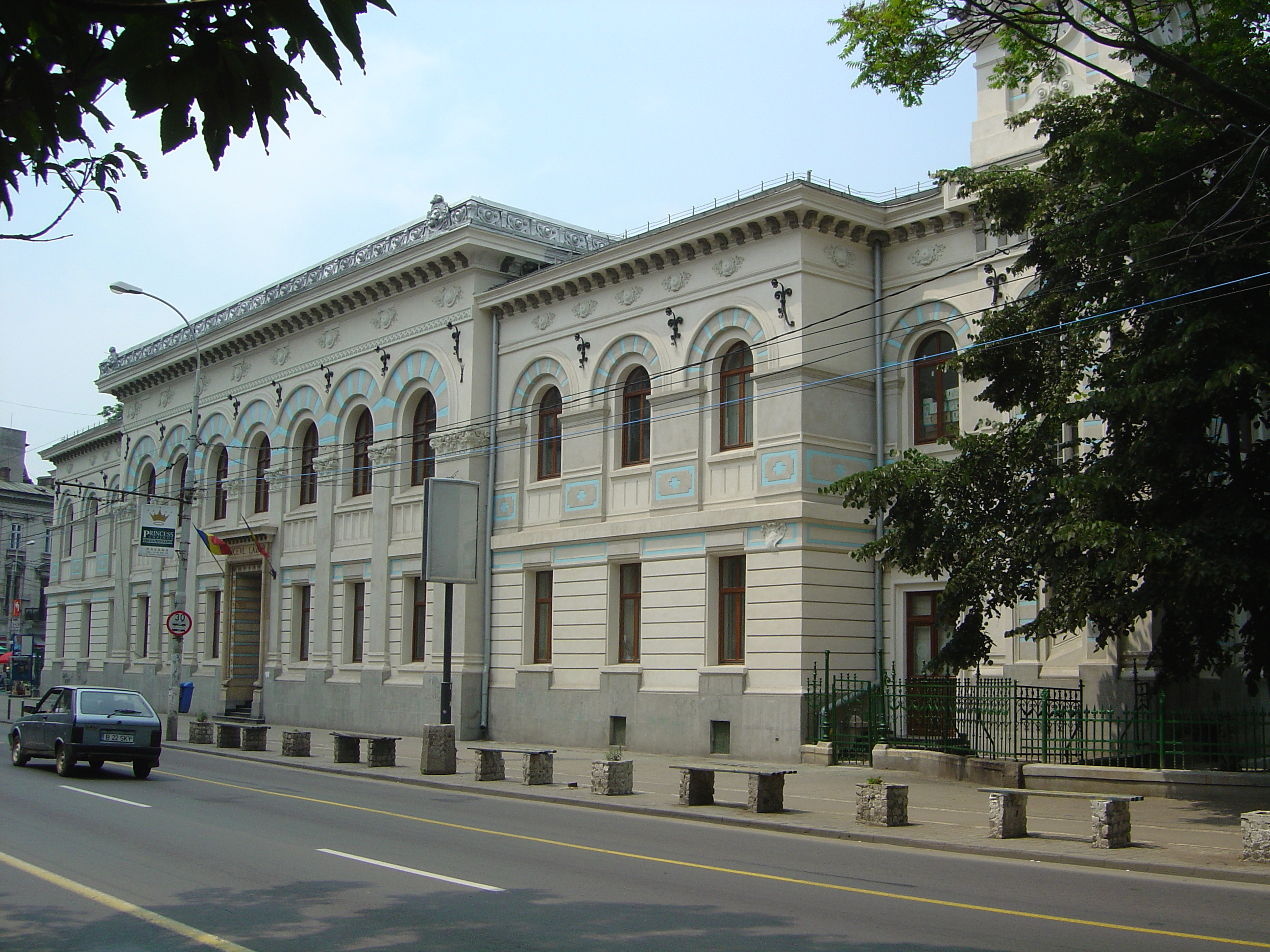

Location
- Regina Elisabeta Boulevard no. 48; Bucharest; Romania; 44°26′6.06″N 26°5′24.73″E

Information
- Funding type: Public
- Established: 1860
- Founder: Gheorghe Lazăr
- Status: Open
- Category: High School
- Grades: 5 to 12
- Gender: coeducation
- Age range: 10–19
- Enrollment: 1,199 (2026)
- Average class size: 28
- Language: Romanian
- Hours in school day: 5–7
- Campus type: Urban
- Nickname: CNGL
- Website: cnlazar.ro

The Gheorghe Lazăr National College (Romanian: Colegiul Național Gheorghe Lazăr) is a high school located in central Bucharest, Romania, at the southeast corner of the Cișmigiu Gardens, on the corner of Bulevardul Regina Elisabeta. One of the most prestigious secondary education institutions in Romania, it was named after the Transylvanian educator Gheorghe Lazăr, who taught at the Saint Sava College. Founded in 1860, it is the second oldest high school in Bucharest.

== History ==
On 18 January 1860, Alexandru Ioan Cuza founded the second gymnasium with teaching in Romanian in Bucharest and gave it the name of Gheorghe Lazăr, who "was the refounder of the nation's schools". The high school's anniversary has been celebrated from then on this date, when the school first opened its doors.

The decree of the establishment of the high school bears the signature of King Carol I and the date 20 May 1890. In the autumn of 1890, the new place near the Cișmigiu Gardens was inaugurated. The construction, designed by architect F. G. Muntureanu, who studied in England, is an architectural jewel of elegant sobriety, combining several styles: from the Brâncovenesc to the neoclassical English one. It is not by chance that the Lazăr High School has been compared to the Parisian high schools near the Jardin du Luxembourg.

In 1931, the new wing of the high school was built at the initiative of the general assembly of parents, which allowed the development of new laboratories, the elegant amphitheatre, the semi-basement buffet. In the Stalinist era, the high school suffered. First, it was given a number instead of its old name: it became Middle School No. 22. It shared the building with a new girls' school and in 1949 the high school was transferred, along with the archive and everything else (paintings by former directors, books, documents, commemorative plaques), at the former Spiru Haret High School. Mechanic Gheorghe Dinu saved from destruction the Book of Honor of the high school, hiding it in the attic of the school. In 1955 the ministry decided to return to the old name, the resumption of possession of the place and the establishment of mixed schools.

Some remarkable achievements of the 1990–1997 period are the radical strengthening the school's building under the administration of principal Nicolae Novac; the high school's affiliation with UNESCO (1992); twinning with the French high school "Jean Monnet" in Joué-lès-Tours; protocol initiated and consolidated by Professor Roxana Veleanovici (1991); and receiving the National College title (1995).

== Motto and symbols ==
From the mid-2010s the high school's motto has been "Pentru unii un liceu, pentru noi un mod de viață", meaning "For some a high school, for us a way of life". Previously it was "Acest liceu este făcut pentru învingătorii vieţii", meaning "This high school is made for life's victors".

The motto of the student council is "Chaque enfant qu'on enseigne est un homme qu'on gagne", in English "Every child we teach is a person we win".

The old anthem of the high school, on a text by V. I. Păun and a song by G. Brătianu, was presented for the first time during the first celebration of the patron's commemoration on 18 January 1892. In 1910, on the occasion of the school's semicentennial, the high school orchestra and choir performed under the baton of Master Ion Costescu a new variant of the anthem, on the conductor's music.

== Notable alumni and faculty ==
=== Alumni ===
- Ion Andreescu
- Alexandru Athanasiu
- Aurel Babeș
- Grigore Băjenaru
- Ion Barbu
- Emilian Bratu
- George Călinescu
- Elie Carafoli
- George Ciprian
- Liviu Ciulei
- Mitiță Constantinescu
- Eugen Filotti
- Alexandru Ghika
- Virgil Gligor
- Sanda Golopenția-Eretescu
- Marcel Janco
- Alexandru Kirițescu
- Leon Lichtblau
- Gabriel Liiceanu
- Dinu Lipatti
- Marius Nasta
- Camil Petrescu
- Florian Pittiș
- Alexandru Proca
- George Simion
- Ilie Șteflea
- Valeriu Stoica
- Constantin Tănase
- Urmuz
- George Vâlsan
- Tudor Vianu
- Vasile Voiculescu

=== Faculty ===
- Constantin Noe
