= Ion Vîlcu =

Ion Vîlcu (born May 12, 1966 Bucharest) is a Romanian software engineer, academic, administrator and diplomat who served as the Ambassador of Romania in Chile, Argentina, Spain and Mexico. He is now Director of Affiliate Members Department of UNWTO.

Vîlcu is married to Florica Cristina Vîlcu and has two daughters, Claudia Ioana born in 1995 and Maria Elena born in 2005.

== Education ==
In 1990, Vîlcu graduated from the Politehnica University of Bucharest, specializing in Computers / Software. He received a PhD in Political Science from the Pontifical Catholic University of Argentina in Buenos Aires.

Vîlcu's post graduate work also includes studies in international relations at the Matías Romero Institute in Mexico City from 1998 to 1999 and the Romanian Institute of International Relations (IRSI) and Ministry of Foreign Affairs, from 1993 to 1994.

Vîlcu is also a graduate of the "Executive Education - from Corporate to Social Leadership" program at the Business School of Torcuato di Tella University.

=== Professional Experience ===
In 1990, Vîlcu became a software engineer for IPRS Baneasa S.A. However, in 1992 he moved to Romania to work as an engineer researcher at the Transport Research Institute (INCERTRANS) in Bucharest.

In August 1992, after passing a civil service competition, Vîlcu took a diplomatic position with the Ministry of Foreign Affairs, attached to the third secretary in the Protocol Department. In 1995, he transferred to the Latin America Department. Later that year, Vîlcu was assigned to the Romanian embassy in Mexico City as a secretary. In 1999, Vîlcu was named Director of Latin America, MFA.

In 2000, Vîlcu began his first ambassadorial posting as the ambassador to Chile. In June 2003, he attended the General Assembly of the Organization of American States (OAS) in Santiago de Chile. He also attended meetings of the Convening Group" Community of Democracies, in Santiago de Chile and in June 2004 the Annual Conference of the UN Commission for Latin America and the Caribbean (ECLAC), in San Juan, Puerto Rico.

In 2005, Vîlcu became Counselor of State, Head of Protocol of the Prime Minister of Romania.

In 2007, Vîlcu became ambassador to Argentina and Paraguay. In 2010, he attend the European Union - Latin America and the Caribbean on Science and Technology (EU-LAC SOM) meeting in Buenos Aires. In 2011 he was ambassador to Spain. In 2016, he served as ambassador to Mexico, Honduras, Nicaragua, El Salvador, Costa Rica, and Guatemala.

Vîlcu is currently Director in UNWTO, Affiliate Members Department

== Scientific and academic activities ==
- Master professor at Nebrija University Madrid - Geopolitical and Diplomatic and consular Law
- Conferences, lectures on topics of International Relations and Political Science at the University of Santiago de Chile-USACH (2003–2004), Catholic University of Valparaiso, Chile (2004), Arturo Prat University, Chile (2004), European Club in Buenos Aires (2010) etc.
- Panelist at the 2009 Global Forum Latin dedicated to celebrating 20 years since "Berlin Wall" in the panel "Guvernabilitate democratic, institutional quality and economic development in Central and Eastern Europe 1989-2009", Buenos Aires, November 2009.
- Argentinian lectures at the Catholic University (2010) and Universidad del Salvador in Buenos Aires (2011) - Visiting Professor.

== Decorations ==
- 2016 Order of Isabella the Catholic, the Grand Cross, Spain
- 2011 Order of Merit of the Republic of Argentina, the Grand Cross
- 2007 Order "Diplomatic Merit" of Romania, Knight
- 2005 Grand Cross of the Order of Merit (Chile)
- 2000 Order "Faithful Service" Romanian in Knight

== Languages ==
Spanish, English, French
