= Ion Oncescu =

Romanian arm wrestler (born 1978)

- Born: April 25, 1978 (age 47) (Romania) Bucharest
- Occupation: Arm wrestler
- Height: 1.85 m (6 ft 1 in)
- Title: World arm wrestling champion

Ion Oncescu (born April 25, 1978, in Bucharest) is a professional Romanian armwrestler, a multiple time world and European champion for both the left and the right hand. He was inducted in March 2011 in the World's Hall of Fame "The 50 Greatest Armwrestlers In History".

== Biography ==
In his youth at the age of 12 he made plans to run out of Communist Romania and started an intensive training program that included daily jogging and swimming so that he could be ready, by the age of 17, for any obstacle that could emerge during his intended flight from the country. His first contact with sports took place at FC Dinamo București where he played football at a youth level, but he soon found tennis more interesting and started to train under the guidance of Florin Segărceanu.

Ion Oncescu won his first national arm wrestling title when he was 18 years old and since then has been undisputed champion despite starting specific arm wrestling training in 2005, nine years after his debut. He graduated the Journalism faculty and the Bucharest Academy of Economic Studies International Business and Economics profile.

He became a first time world champion at the XXIXth World Armwrestling Championships held in Veliko Tarnovo, Bulgaria in October 2007. For the left arm Oncescu had to engage in 10 matches, and of his opponents five of them were past world champions. In the second round he surprisingly lost against the Bulgarian champion Stoyan Golemanov, but recovered and reached the final against Russian Dzambolat Tsoriev, who was undefeated at that time. Ion Oncescu won 2–0 and became world champion for the first time in his career. The next day he had to compete for the right arm championship, and was engaged in eight matches and reached the final where he met the same Dzambolat Tsoriev. Oncescu lost the first match but won the other two and became world champion for the right arm and for the whole tournament world undisputed champion, receiving US$23,000 in prize money.

Ion Oncescu won his third and fourth world title at the World Armwrestling Championships held in Kelowna, Canada. He had to engage in 20 matches, 10 for the left arm and 10 for the right arm on his way to his two world titles.

In 2009 shot down 100 opponents.

In 2010 shot down 300 opponents.

On 20 February 2011 event "Oncescu vs. 500" at Băneasa Shopping City and live on Sport.ro shot down 500 opponents (including: K-1 fighter Tolea Ciumac; weightlifting champion Ninel Miculescu; professional basketball player Virgil Stănescu; darts, bodybuilding and shot put national champion Daniel Racoveanu).

On February 12, 2012 at Sun Plaza Bucharest, after a contest of almost 8 hours with 1000 opponents, Oncescu set a new World Record, which was certified by Guinness World Records representative, beating all the 1000 participants (even 1024 until stop contest). The show was televised live on sport.ro TV channel.

== World and European arm wrestling championships ==
Year	Placement	Location	Comments
2004	9 and 6	(South Africa) Durban	WCH (left and right arms)
2004	4 and 5	(Poland) Gdynia	ECH (left and right arms)
2005	2	(Bulgaria) Sofia	ECH (left and right arms)
2006	2 and 3	(Hungary) Budapest	ECH (left and right arms)
2007	2	(Poland) Warsaw	Nemiroff World Cup (left and right arms and absolute vice-champion left handed)
2007	1	(Bulgaria) Veliko Tarnovo	WCH First two titles (left and right arms)
2008	1	(Canada) Kelowna	WCH Third and fourth titles (left and right arms)
2009	1	(Italy) Rome	Vendetta IV Super Match against Normunds Tomsons best of five games (left and right arms)
2009	1	(Bulgaria) Sofia	ECH First two titles (left and right arms)
2010	1	(United States) Mesquite	WCH Fifth title (left arm)
