= Emilian Bratu =

Romanian chemical engineer, founder of chemical engineering education in Romania

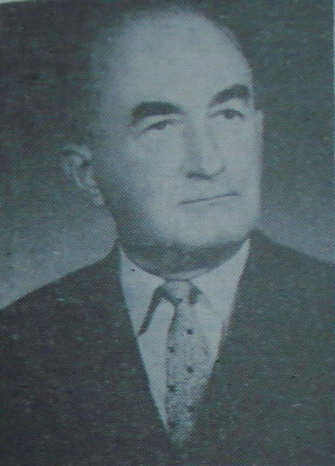
Emilian Bratu.jpg

Emilian Bratu (8 August 1904 – 31 March 1991) was a Romanian chemical engineer, founder of chemical engineering education in Romania. With the Austrian physical chemist Otto Redlich, he studied the dissociation constant of heavy water.

== Life and work ==
Born in Bucharest, he studied at the Saint Sava, Gheorghe Lazăr, and Matei Basarab high schools and the National School of Bridges and Roads, the future Politehnica University of Bucharest. He then attended the Technical University of Vienna, specializing in physical chemistry and electrochemistry. Here he met Redlich, with whom he studied the properties of heavy water between 1932 and 1935.

Returning home he taught a course titled Processes and Devices in Chemical Industry, forerunner of chemical engineering courses in Romania.

== Collaboration with Costin Nenițescu ==
Emilian Bratu and Costin Nenițescu were two senior professors of the Faculty of Industrial Chemistry. The two scholars were good friends who have been deeply respected in the course of their life. Both of them, having German education, have early intuited the necessity of introducing in Romania the Chemical Engineering discipline for higher polytechnic education, starting from the favorable external prospects related to the development of the chemical industry based on national raw material reserves. They fought together to assert chemistry in Polytechnics, and largely thanks to their effort, in 1938 the "Industrial Chemistry" name for Polytechnics faculty was introduced.

Thus, in 1940–1950, Nenițescu supported Bratu's effort for establishing and consolidating of the Department of Processes and Apparatus in Bucharest, which later became the Department of Chemical Engineering, being the first such chair in the country and among the first in Europe. On the other hand, in the early 1950s, Bratu accepted the request of Nenițescu to give a lecture on the progress of chemical engineering, especially in the field of application of chemical similarity in the chemical reactions. The lecture was given to the teaching staff and research collaborators in the field of Organic Chemistry. On the whole, the lecture was a rousing interest.
