= Valentin Neacșu =

Romanian footballer

Personal information
- Full name: Alexandru Valentin Neacșu
- Date of birth: 9 February 2000 (age 26)
- Place of birth: Bucharest, Romania
- Height: 1.84 m (6 ft 0 in)
- Position: Goalkeeper

Youth career
- –2020: Voluntari

Senior career*
Years	Team	Apps	(Gls)
2020–2023	Voluntari	1	(0)
2020–2023	Voluntari II	13	(0)
2020–2021	→ Viitorul Șelimbăr (loan)	4	(0)
2022	→ Gloria Bistrița (loan)	4	(0)
2022–2023	→ Viitorul Șimian (loan)	12	(0)
2023	→ Concordia Chiajna (loan)	1	(0)
2023	Gloria Bistrița	0	(0)
2024	Agricola Borcea	5	(0)
- * Club domestic league appearances and goals as of 13:12, 13 January 2024 (UTC)

Alexandru Valentin Neacșu (born 9 February 2000) is a Romanian professional footballer who plays as a goalkeeper. He made his debut in Liga I on 9 August 2021, in a match between FC Voluntari and CS Universitatea Craiova, ended with the score of 0-3.
