= Eddy Novarro =

Eddy Novarro (c. 1926–2003) (real Vasile Novaru) was a photographer, a collector, and a cosmopolitan. He dedicated his work to the great artists of the 20th century. Important painters and sculptors such as Pablo Picasso, Marcel Duchamp, Hans Arp, Joseph Beuys and Robert Rauschenberg were among Novarro's friends. He photographed them repeatedly. At first, his first wife, Nana (Renate) Novarro (1940-1986), an artist too, was the one who made most of the appointments with the great artists for Eddy, and later on his last wife, Tatiana Grigorieva Novarro, managed the appointments. Eddy and Nana received paintings and the artists added "For Nana and Eddy" – today a respectful collection.

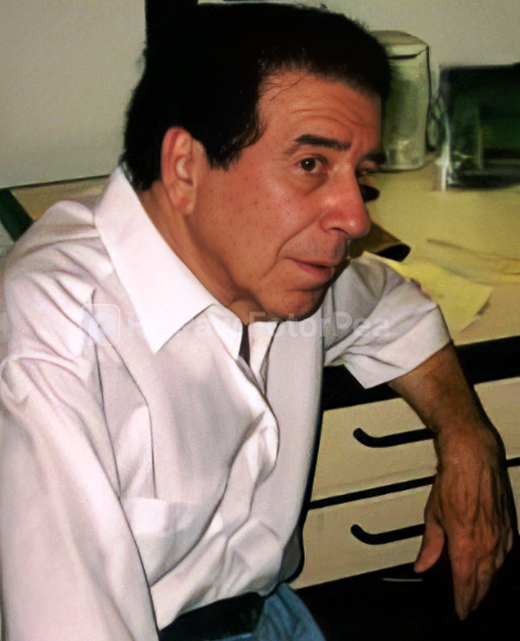
Eddy Novarro de Craiova 1926-2003 Photographer

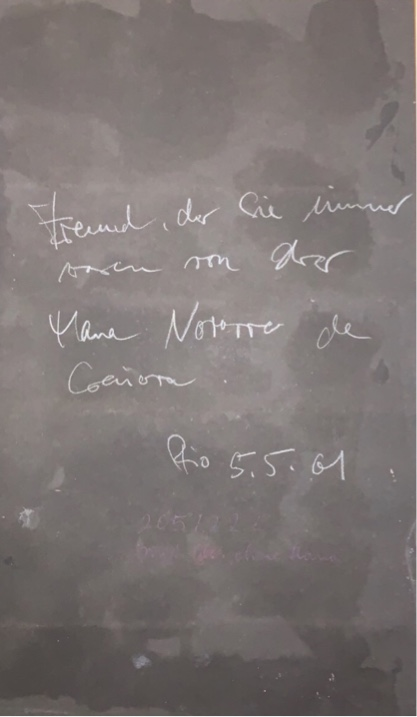
Signature of Artist (Renate) Nana Novarro de Craiova - Wife of Photographer Eddy Novarro - 1961 (FOR NANA AND EDDY)

== Early life ==
Novarro was of Romanian descent and was born in Bucharest 1926, Mother an artist, living in Aschkelon or Ashqelon, arabic عسقلان, Israel. Early on, the Yugoslav king bestowed upon him the title "Baron de Craiova" in recognition of his artistic achievements. After emigrating to Brazil via Italy in 1946, he settled in Rio de Janeiro.

== Career ==
In 1958, Novarro accepted an invitation from the architect Sergio Wladimir Bernardes to travel to the EXPO in Brussels and document the Brazilian pavilion in a photo series. it was there that he met René Magritte, who introduced him to the Paris surrealist circle.

From the seventies onward, Novarro lived part of the time in Germany, because he considered Europe "the center of art". On a visit to New York City in February 1978, Novarro met gallery owner Leo Castelli, who familiarized him with the Pop art scene. He soon came into contact with Pop art artists such as Robert Rauschenberg, Andy Warhol and Roy Lichtenstein.

== Works ==
Novarro's friends and clients included heads of state, presidents, actors as well as artists. In the course of several decades he made portraits of Ava Gardner, Elizabeth Taylor, King Hussein of Jordan, Evita Peron and the Dalai Lama.
