= Radu Almășan =

Romanian singer

Radu Almăşan
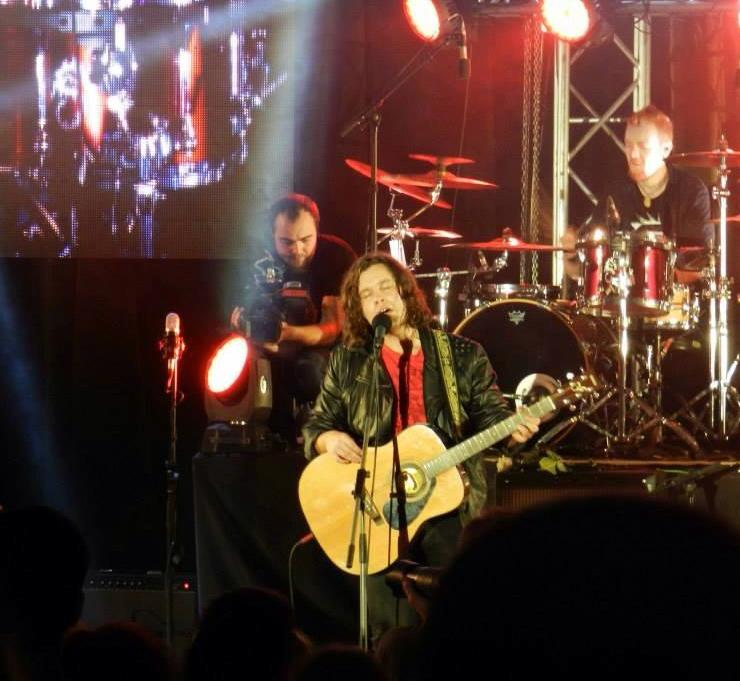
- Radu Almășan performing at Cinema Patria in Bucharest.

Background information
- Born: 10 November 1980 (age 45); Brașov, Romania
- Genres: Alternative rock, pop rock, Latin rock
- Occupations: Singer-songwriter, musician, producer
- Instruments: Vocals, acoustic guitar, electric guitar
- Years active: 1999–present
- Member of: Bosquito; Madame Hooligan

Radu Almășan (Romanian pronunciation: [ˈradu alməˈʃan]) is a Romanian singer, most notable for his work in the band Bosquito, which he has led as the primary vocalist since its inception in 1999. He is also a founding member of the American alternative rock band Madame Hooligan.

== Biography ==
Born in Brașov, Romania, Radu gained international notoriety with the success of Bosquito following the band's inception in 1999. After releasing four successful albums with the band, Radu moved to Los Angeles, formed his new band Madame Hooligan in 2007, and released their debut album in 2008. In 2010, Radu Almășan staged a comeback with Bosquito in his native Romania, releasing several successful singles with the new lineup and releasing Babylon, the band's fifth album to date.

== Discography ==
As Bosquito:

- 2000: Bosquito
- 2002: Sar scântei
- 2003: Cocktail Molotov
- 2004: Fărâme din soare
- 2014: Babylon
- 2019: Sus

As Madame Hooligan:

- 2008: "Antiheroes"
