= Florin-Alexandru Alexe =

Romanian economist and politician

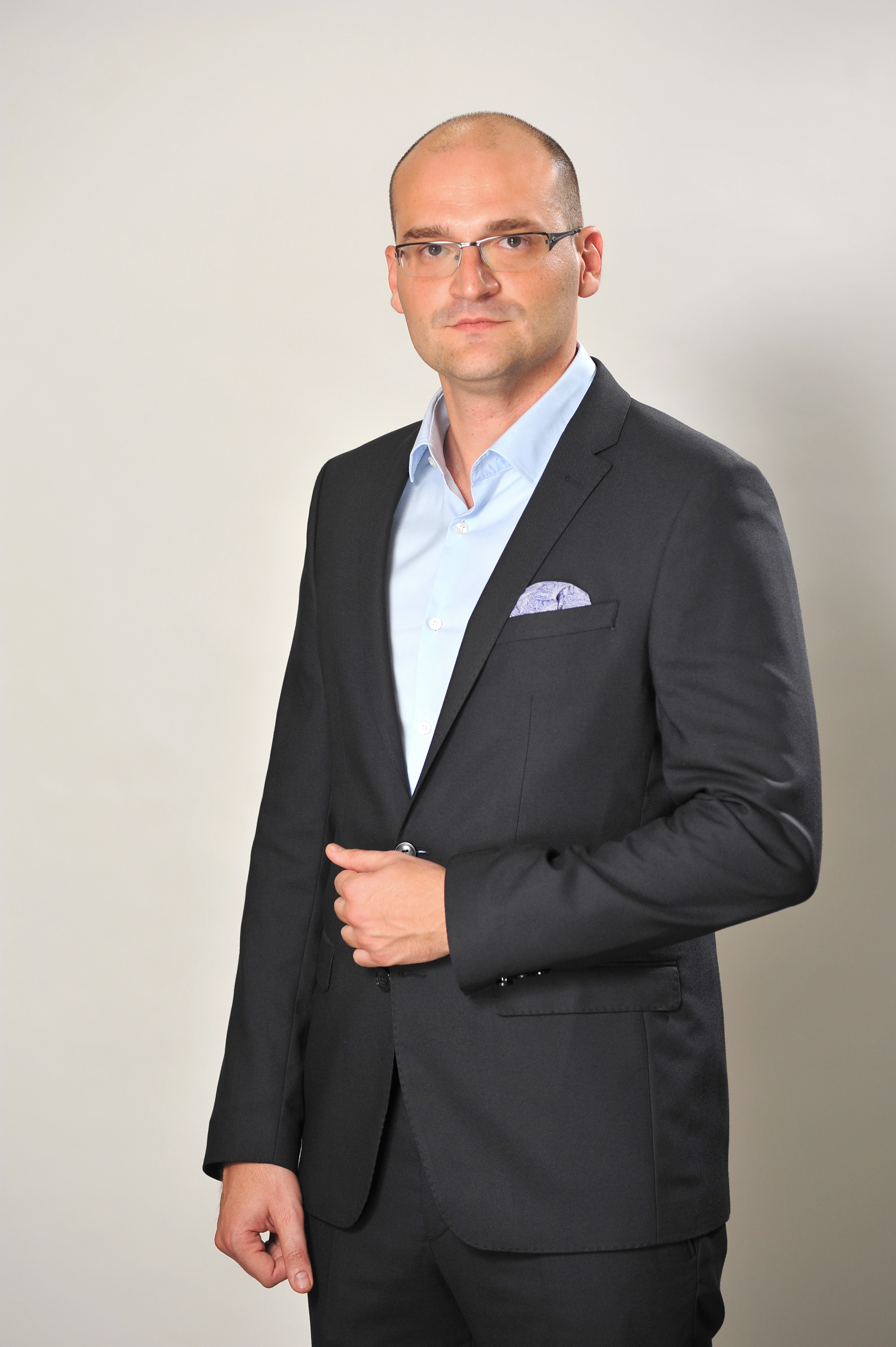

President of the National Liberal Youth
- Incumbent
- Assumed office 2009
- Preceded by: Cristian Adomniței

President of PNL Sector 3
- Incumbent
- Assumed office 2009

City Councillor, Bucharest City Council
- In office 2008–2012

City Councillor, Sector 3 Council, Bucharest
- In office 2004–2008

MP for Constituency 10 in Sector 3, Bucharest
- Incumbent
- Assumed office 2012

Personal details
- Born: 30 August 1979 (age 47) Bucharest, Romania
- Party: PNL
- Education: Bucharest Academy of Economic Studies, Bucharest
- Occupation: Politician
- Profession: Economist

Florin-Alexandru Alexe (born 30 August 1979) is a Romanian economist and politician. He is currently a Member of Parliament, the President of PNL’s Sector 3 chapter, as well as the President of the National Liberal Youth, the youth organisation of the National Liberal Party (PNL). He served as City Councillor, first in the Local Council of Bucharest’s Sector 3, then in the General Council of Bucharest.

== Biography ==
Alexe was born in Bucharest, Socialist Republic of Romania.

In 2002, he graduated from the Bucharest Academy of Economic Studies (ASE), having read Marketing at the Faculty of Commerce. Between 2002 and 2003, he took graduate courses at the same institution, and between 2008 and 2010 he took courses of International Relations and European Integration at the Romanian Diplomatic Institute. Since 2010, he is a PhD candidate at the Academy of Economic Studies (ASE), Bucharest, with a thesis focusing on the brand of Bucharest.

Since 2002, he has been coordinated the marketing activity of several companies, such as Radio Contact, Kiss FM or Centrul National Media – National FM. He is currently Marketing Director at Centrul National Media.

He began his political career in 2000, when he joined the National Liberal Party (PNL), becoming part of its chapter in Sector 3. In 2003, he became the President of the Youth Organisation of that chapter, a position he held until 2005. In 2006, he was appointed to the position of PNL Liaison for the Liberal Parties from the Republic of Moldova. In 2009, following a Congress of the TNL (the National Liberal Youth, the youth organisation of the National Liberal Party), he has been elected president. The same year, he has been elected President of the Sector 3 chapter of PNL. Since 2010, he has been a member of the Political Bureau of PNL, the main governing body of the party. He has been re-elected as President of TNL in May 2011 and again in May 2013.

During his political career, he has served as city councillor for two consecutive mandates. Between 2004 and 2008, he was a member of the Local Council in Bucharest’s Sector 3. From 2008 to 2012 he was a member of the General Council of the City of Bucharest. In December 2012, he has been elected as an MP, representing in the Chamber of Deputies the uninominal college no.10 in Bucharest. He is the Secretary of the Commission for Culture, Arts and Mass Media in the Chamber of Deputies.
