= Alina Stancu =

Romanian journalist and television presenter

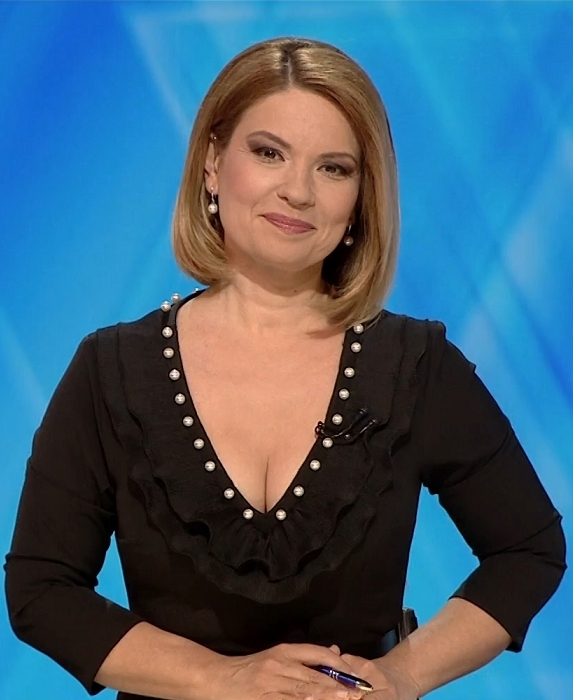
- Born: November 22, 1977 (age 48); Bucharest, Romania
- Education: Hyperion University of Bucharest
- Occupations: journalist, television presenter
- Years active: 1995—present

Alina Stancu (born 22 November 1977) is a Romanian journalist and television presenter. She works at TVR, the Romanian national television broadcasting network.

Alina began her career in 1995 at Tele 7 ABC television station, working as a reporter and editor for the news program Telejurnal. Between 1998 and 2003 she activated at Pro TV și Acasă TV, and then, in 2003 she produced and presented programs about social and political issues at B1 TV, another well known Romanian TV station. She joined the news team at TVR in August 2011, becoming one of the moderators of Info+ live debates.
