= Teiul Doamnei Ghica Church =

Orthodox church in Bucharest, Romania

Coordinates: 44°28′00″N 26°07′42″E

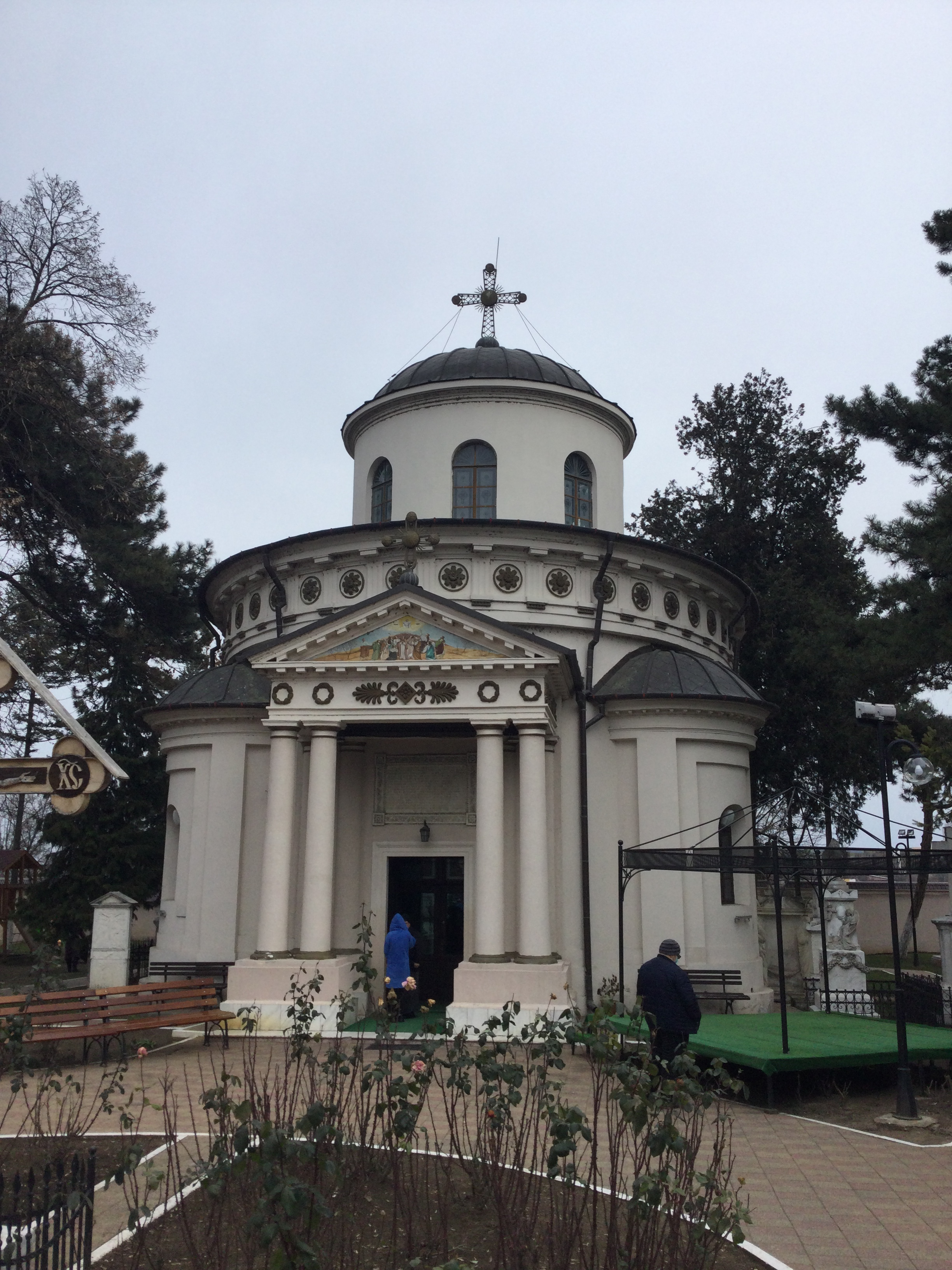
Teiul Doamnei Ghica Church

The Teiul Doamnei Ghica Church (Romanian: Biserica Teiul Doamnei Ghica, lit. “Lady Ghica’s linden tree”) is a Romanian Orthodox church located at 3 Doamna Ghica Street in Bucharest, Romania. It is dedicated to the Feast of the Ascension.

In the 18th century, according to the pisanie, Vistier (treasurer) Barbu Văcărescu established a church that stood on the circle in front of the present structure. The latter was built in 1833 by Grigore IV Ghica, the former Prince of Wallachia, and his son Grigore. After the completion of construction, supervised by a German architect, the church was sanctified by Grigorie III, Metropolitan of Ungro-Wallachia. It then became a chapel of the neighboring Ghica Tei Palace. Repairs took place in 1894. The dome collapsed during the 1940 earthquake and was rebuilt simply, without the original Neoclassical decorations. Significant repairs were also carried out following the 1977 earthquake.

An Italianate Neoclassical structure, the church has been described as the city’s most original. It is situated in a separate yard from the adjacent palace, withdrawn from street level, on the high bank of a lake. A slight ellipse in shape, it measures 18 meters long by 13 meters wide, planned as a unitary composition. The main space is covered by a large vaulted cupola, on which sits the round dome with eight windows. There are four rather small, symmetrical semi-circular niches, covered in quarter-sphere roofs: two on the east, leading out of the altar, and two on the west, containing the choir balcony stairs. The westerly entrance is preceded by a small portico with four Tuscan Doric columns, two each on a joint base, that support a triangular painted pediment. Two pairs of pilasters flank the door, with the pisanie placed above. The facades are decorated with Doric pilasters, also found on the interior. On the upper part, there is a frieze with triglyphs and a metope with a floral pattern. The windows end in a semicircle.

The interior was painted in oil by an Italian artist; the frescoes are Byzantine Revival with Western touches, inscribed in panels with Baroque frames. The portrait of the main ktetor, Prince Ghica, is on the left side of the entrance, with his son on the right, along with the three ktetors of the first church: Văcărescu, his wife and daughter. The carved wood iconostasis, in late Viennese Baroque, is sinuous, as is the balcony railing, both adapted to the interior architecture; each also features wooden columns, with either straight or curved fluting. The princely throne, iconostasis frame and side choir stalls and railing are all richly decorated. A glass case behind the throne encloses flags received by the prince from the Sublime Porte, a sign of his authority.

The church is surrounded by graves of Ghica family members. The bell tower, situated to the east, towards the lake below, is a massive square structure on two levels, the tower being decorated with Ionic pilasters. The church is listed as a historic monument by Romania's Ministry of Culture and Religious Affairs.
