= Personal Editor =

1980s text editor by IBM

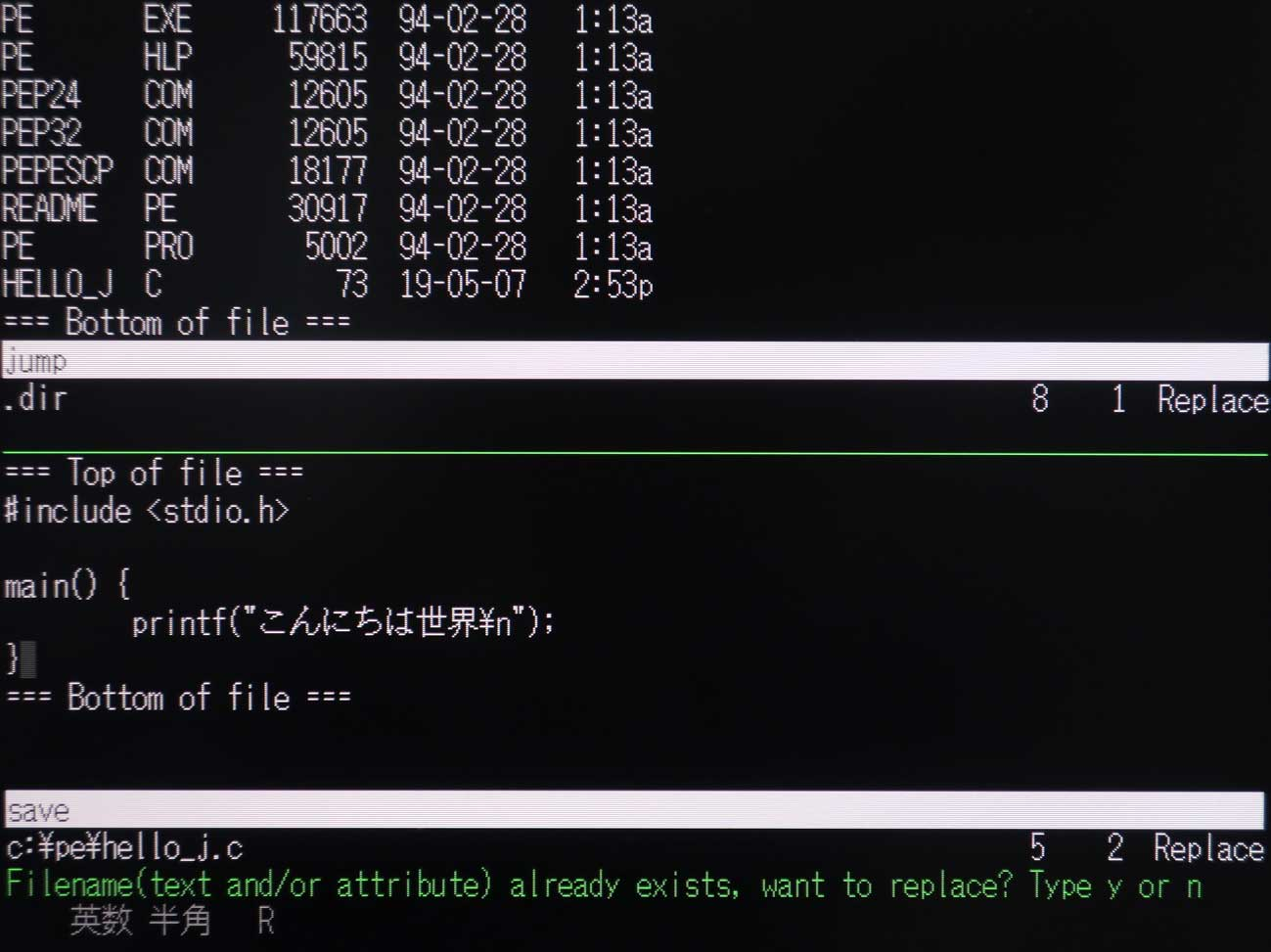
- Developer: IBM
- Initial release: 1982; 44 years ago
- Operating system: PC DOS, DOS/V
- Platform: IBM PC compatible
- Type: Text editor
- License: Proprietary software

Personal Editor (PE) and Personal Editor II (PE2) was a text editor developed by IBM for IBM PC DOS and MS-DOS in the 1980s. It became popular because of its easy, fast, and programmable (custom keyboard shortcuts) user interface.

PE influenced its successor text editors, such as Personal Editor 32, a modern 32-bit editor with a user interface based on PE2, and QE, a text editor for Linux systems.

For Asia-Pacific region, IBM Japan released a DBCS version of Personal Editor for IBM 5550 and PS/55. It was available in IBM's lineup over the years.

== See also ==
- E (PC DOS)
