= IBM Kanji System =

Japanese language system for IBM System/360

The IBM Kanji System was announced in 1971 to support Japanese language processing on the IBM System/360 computers. It was later enhanced by the support of IBM System/34, IBM 5550 and DOS/V.

== General ==
The IBM Kanji System became available in a series of staged announcements. Its initial technical demonstration was done at Expo '70 in Osaka, and an official announcement was made in 1971, including:

- IBM 2245 Kanji Printer
- IBM 5924 Kanji Keypunch
- IBM System/360-System/370 OS/VS1 & DOS/VSE Programming support

The Kanji Keypunch was able to punch up to 2950 kinds of Kanji characters, using the left hand to select one of the 15 shift keys and the right hand to select one of the 240 Kanji characters for each shift. Until that time, only English alphanumeric and Japanese half-width Katakana characters were processed on IBM mainframes. The IBM Kanji System thus established the basis for handling up to about 10,000 Japanese characters used in the daily life.

The IBM Kanji System was further enhanced in September 1979 to include:

Hardware

- Offline input/output
  - IBM 5924 T01 Kanji Keypunch (IBM 029 Key Punch with 12-shift key Kanji keyboard) - RPQ
- Online terminals
  - IBM 3270 Subsystem
    - IBM 3274 model 52C Control Unit with Kanji processing functions
    - IBM 3278 model 52 Display (IBM 3278 Display with 12-shift key Kanji keyboard)
    - IBM 3283 model 52 Inkjet Printer
- Online printer
  - IBM 3800-2 Printing Subsystem

Kanji support software

- Operating Systems
  - OS/VS1
  - DOS/VSE
  - IBM 8100 DPPX
- Development Languages
  - COBOL
  - PL/I
- DBCS support
  - IMS
  - CICS
- Utility programs

The IBM Kanji System was planned, designed, and implemented mainly by Double-byte Technical Coordination Organization (DTCO) and development departments in IBM Fujisawa Laboratory, assisted by IBM Endicott Lab (IBM 029), Poughkeepsie Lab (OS/VS), Kingston Lab (IBM 3270), Santa Teresa Lab (IMS), Hursley Lab (CICS), Boeblingen Lab (DOS/VSE) and other locations as well as related vendors.

These announcements were followed by other announcements:

- IBM System/34 Kanji System, using IBM 5250 display (October, 1979)
- IBM 3283-053 Kanji Printer (1981)
- IBM 3200 Kanji Printer (1982)
- IBM 3270 emulation and IBM 5250 emulation by the Japanese PCs:
  - IBM 5550 (1984)
  - DOS/V (1991)

== Competition and cooperation ==
At the time of its development, Japan's major mainframe companies were developing their own Japanese processing systems independently and at the same time cooperating to establish a Japanese character code industry standard (JIS X 0208). Some of these systems are:

- JEF (Japanese processing Extended Facility) by Fujitsu
- JIPS (Japanese Information Processing System) by NEC
- KEIS (Kanji processing Extended Information System) by Hitachi

== Effect to the support of other languages ==
Similar supports later became available for Korean, and Chinese (both in Traditional and Simplified forms).

== See also ==
- Japanese language
- Kanji
- DBCS
- CJK characters
- List of IBM products
- IBM 2245
- IBM 5924
