= PC Open Architecture Developers' Group =

- Native name: PCオープン・アーキテクチャー推進協議会
- Company type: Consortium
- Founded: 1991; 34 years ago in Japan
- Founder: IBM
- Website: oadg.org at the Wayback Machine (archived 2006-05-11)

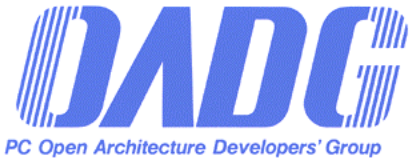
Other logo

PC Open Architecture Developers' Group (OADG, Japanese: PCオープン・アーキテクチャー推進協議会) is a consortium of the major Japanese personal computer manufacturers. Sponsored by IBM during the 1990s, it successfully guided Japan's personal computer manufacturing companies at that time into standardising to an IBM PC-compatible and open architecture.

== History ==
Before the advent of the IBM PC in 1981 in the United States, there were many different varieties and designs of personal computer. Examples from that era include the Tandy RadioShack and Commodore. These machines were each based upon a different computer architecture and the software programs that ran on them were compatible only with the machine they had been designed for. In Japan, except for the MSX, this situation continued well into the early 1990s, because three of Japan's major electronics manufacturers (NEC, Sharp and Fujitsu) had also designed their own unique personal computers; although NEC with its PC-98 was at that time the most successful.

The American computer manufacturer IBM had entered the Japanese market with its own IBM 5550 computer. Japanese-language-capable computers at the time, however, had special requirements in terms of processor capability and screen size, and IBM's JX project, emphasizing compatibility with the IBM PC, enjoyed limited success. The whole situation was felt by many to be hindering the healthy growth of the Japanese computer industry, particularly since domestic and overseas software vendors had to develop, test and support many different software programs to run on the many different kinds of personal computers sold in Japan.

IBM developed the operating software DOS/V in Japan, and licensed it to other Japanese PC manufacturers. To promote the IBM PC architecture on which DOS/V worked, IBM sponsored a consortium which was named the PC Open Architecture Developers' Group (OADG) in 1991 and made public its internal architecture and interfaces. At the height of this enterprise, the consortium included amongst its members the major Japanese PC manufactures, such as Toshiba and Hitachi, and overseas manufacturers such as Acer of Taiwan and Dell of the United States. Together, they not only strove to develop a unified architecture, but also produced a number of DOS/V-compatible application software programs and participated in the major computer shows. By the time Microsoft's computer operating system Windows 95 had arrived in 1995, the IBM PC architecture, using DOS/V, was already a predominant force in Japan.

== Members ==
In 2003, membership included the following companies:

- Sharp Corporation
- Sony Corporation
- Toshiba Corporation
- IBM Japan
- Hitachi
- Fujitsu
- Panasonic Corporation

== See also ==
- AX consortium
- OS/2
- NEC PC-98
- FM Towns
- Toshiba J-3100
- MSX
