= IBM 2245 =

IBM line printer for East Asian market

IBM 2245 Kanji Printer (Japanese: IBM 2245漢字プリンター) was the line printer of the IBM Kanji System, announced in 1971, that allowed printing of Japanese text on IBM System/360 and System/370 mainframe computers. Later, it would also support printing of Korean and Traditional Chinese text.

== Functions ==
At the Osaka Expo 1970, a prototype of the IBM Kanji System was exhibited. Although the computers in Japan, up to that time, used only the alphanumeric characters like in other countries, this prototype allowed processing of more than ten thousand Kanji and other characters that are used in the Japanese language.

In 1971, IBM officially announced the IBM Kanji System that consisted of the following:

- IBM 5924 Kanji keypunch
- IBM 2245 Kanji Printer
- IBM System/360-System/370 OS/VS & DOS/VSE programming support

The IBM 5924 Kanji Keypunch was an IBM 029 Keypunch (Model T00 with Katakana feature), attached with a specially designed 12-shift Kanji input keyboard. It allowed punching out IBM cards for more than ten thousand kinds of Japanese characters, using two columns (two punch positions) for each Japanese character, to be fed in the regular IBM card reader for being stored in the computer in two bytes for each Japanese character. This new technical approach gave the so-called Double-Byte Character Set languages of Japanese, Korean and Chinese languages the ability to be processed by the computer.

The IBM 2245 Kanji Printer was a line printer on the system side that connected to System/360 or System/370 via the multiplexer channel, block multiplexer channel or selector channel. The printer basically used the dot matrix impact printing mechanism, already employed in the IBM 2560 Multi-Function Card Machine that attached to IBM System/360 Model 20 and later to IBM System/3. Each Japanese double-byte character was printed on continuous paper with 18x22 dots for horizontal writing or with 18x18 for vertical writing. The paper feed mechanism was not a conventional paper tape, but new program control from the computer system was developed.

== Development, manufacturing and marketing ==
The IBM 2245 was developed at IBM Endicott with participation of two or three engineers from IBM Fujisawa, and manufactured in Endicott. It was marketed as a standard product, whereas the IBM 5924 Kanji punch, developed and manufactured in Fujisawa was a special RPQ product. This printer would later support Korean and Traditional Chinese languages, with the effort of IBM Korea's and IBM Taiwan's laboratories, in coordination from IBM Fujisawa.

== Application ==
Although the IBM 2245 Kanji Print could be used in a wide range of applications, it was mainly used to print the names and addresses in corporate correspondence, because the printing span (horizontal width) was relatively narrow. Until that time, the English alphabet and half-width Katakana had been used for computer processing of corporate correspondence, which was quite awkward.

== Critique ==
The information of which wire dot to be hit at which point was prepared on the computer side and transmitted to the printer, which made other jobs in the multitasking OS/360-370 to slow down extensively.

== Successor printer ==
The IBM 3800 Model 2 laser printing subsystem, developed by IBM Rochester, in the second batch announcement of IBM Kanji System in 1979, was the successor machine. Later, it would support not only Korean and Traditional Chinese, but also Simplified Chinese that is used in mainland China.

== See also ==
- IBM Kanji System
- IBM 5924 Kanji keypunch
- Double-Byte Character Set
