= PE2 =

PE2 may refer to:

- Meridian LRT station, Singapore
- Parasite Eve II, an action role-playing survival horror video game
- Personal Editor 2, a text editor for MS-DOS
- Petty Enterprises, NASCAR race team
- Petlyakov Pe-2, Soviet combat aircraft from WW2
- Plastic Explosive No 2
