= Microsoft Japan =

Japanese subsidiary of Microsoft

Microsoft Japan Co., Ltd.

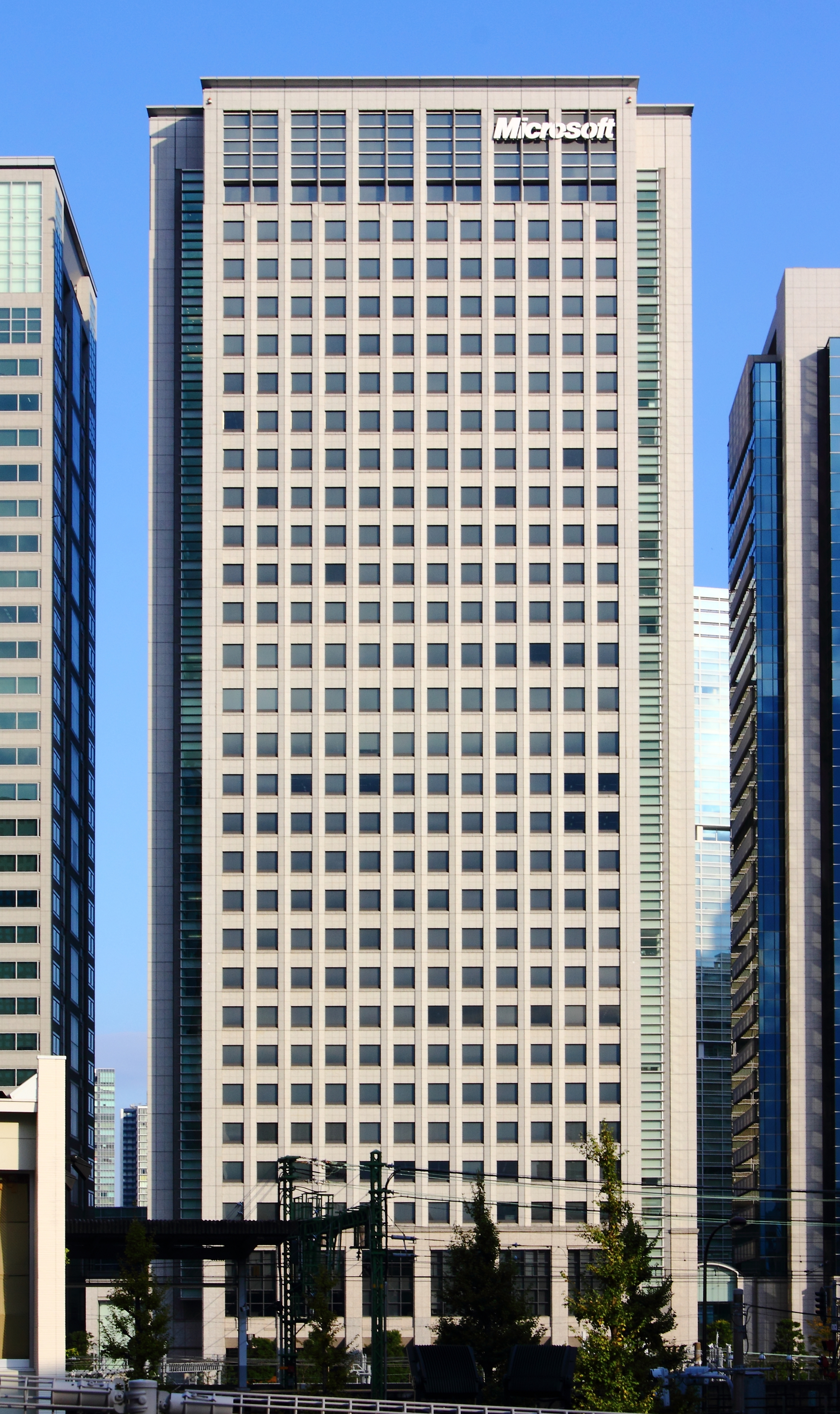
- Headquarters in Minato, Tokyo
- Trade name: Microsoft Japan
- Native name: 日本マイクロソフト株式会社
- Romanized name: Kabushiki-gaisha Nihon Maikurosofuto (K.K. Microsoft Japan Company)
- Formerly: Microsoft Company, Ltd. (1986–2011)
- Type: Subsidiary
- Industry: Technology; Computer hardware; Consumer electronics; Video games
- Predecessors: ASCII Microsoft
- Founded: February 1986; 40 years ago (Note: Originally established as ASCII Microsoft on 1 November 1978.) in Yoyogi, Shibuya
- Founder: Susumu Furukawa; Bill Gates
- Headquarters: Kōnan, Minato, Tokyo, Japan
- Key people: Susumu Furukawa, President (1986–1992); Takuya Hirano, President & CEO (2015–2023); Miki Tsusaka, President (2023–present)
- Revenue: ¥1.51 trillion (US$13.76 billion) (2025)
- Number of employees: 2,225 (2013)
- Parent: Microsoft
- Website: www.microsoft.com/ja-jp/

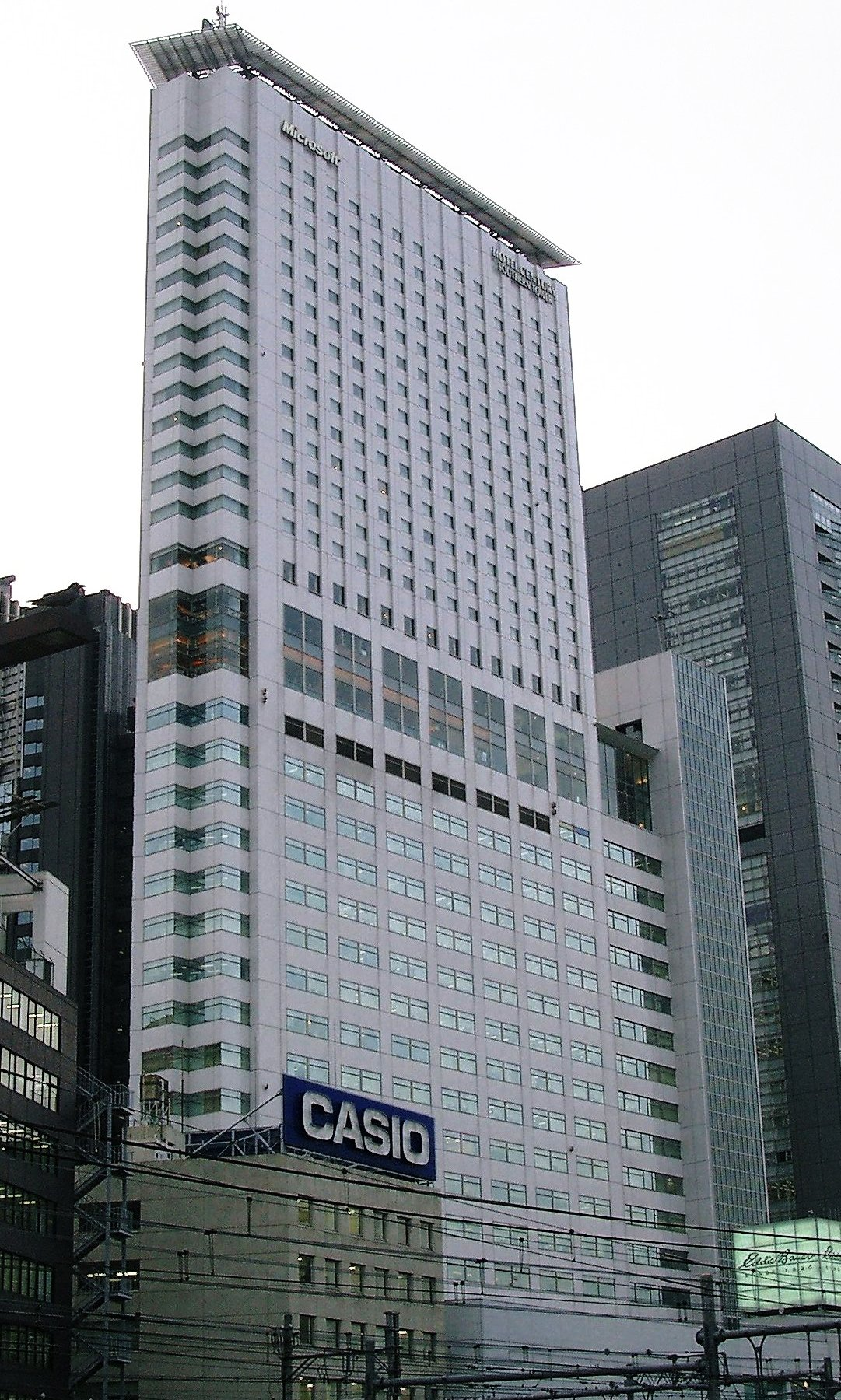
Microsoft Japan's former head office in Odakyu Southern Tower

Microsoft Japan Co., Ltd. (Note: Japanese: 日本マイクロソフト株式会社, Hepburn: Nihon Maikurosofuto Kabushiki-gaisha) (also known as MSKK) is a Japanese subsidiary of Microsoft headquartered in Minato, Tokyo. It develops both hardware and software technologies for consumers and business partners.

Microsoft Japan was founded in February 1986 as Microsoft Company, Ltd. (Note: Japanese: マイクロソフト株式会社, Hepburn: Maikurosofuto kabushikigaisha) by Susumu Furukawa and Bill Gates after partnership between ASCII Corporation and Microsoft ended, with the remaining ASCII Microsoft operations being merged into ASCII.

== History ==
In 1978, Kazuhiko Nishi, co-founder of ASCII Publisher, partnered with Bill Gates and founded ASCII Microsoft (株式会社アスキー・マイクロソフト, Kabushiki Gaisha Asukī Maikurosofuto) as the sole dealer of Microsoft's products in Japan. In 1980, ASCII made 1.2 billion yen of sales from licensing Microsoft BASIC. It was 40 percent of Microsoft's sales, and Nishi became Microsoft's Vice President of Sales for Far East. In 1983, ASCII and Microsoft announced MSX. In 1984, ASCII Microsoft was merged to ASCII.

However, Microsoft founded its own Japan subsidiary, Microsoft Company, Limited (マイクロソフト株式会社, Maikurosofuto Kabushiki Gaisha) often shortened to MSKK, and dissolved partnership with ASCII in 1986. It was because Gates wanted Microsoft to go public in the New York Stock Exchange, and also he opposed Nishi and ASCII's diversification. Susumu Furukawa (古川 享), who was also a member of ASCII, officially became the first president of Microsoft Kabushiki Gaisha. ASCII, which was later ultimately owned by Kadokawa Group in later years, retained the rights to MSX.

In October 1986, Microsoft Japan announced the AX project that was a Japanese computing initiative to allow IBM PCs to handle Japanese text. The AX couldn't break into the Japanese PC market due to its cost and lack of available software.

In October 1990, IBM Japan announced the DOS/V. Furukawa made an appointment with IBM Japan to share the source code of DOS/V. Microsoft Japan supplied the OEM adaptation kit (OAK) of DOS/V for PC manufacturers.

For the Japanese adaptation of Windows 3.1, Microsoft Japan and Ricoh co-developed two Japanese TrueType fonts, MS Gothic and MS Mincho. It took two years, and delayed the release of Japanese Windows 3.1. However, it became the first successful version of Windows in Japan.

In 1998, the Japan Fair Trade Commission informed Microsoft of an unfair trade that Microsoft forced personal computer manufacturers to bundle with Excel and Word against the request of a bundle with Excel and Ichitaro. The company faced another JFTC scrutiny (in midst of European Union actions against Microsoft) when the company was accused of having clauses that hurt the ability of Japanese computer manufacturers to obtain an OEM Windows license in 2004. In 2026, JFTC raided Microsoft on similar monopolistic charges regarding its cloud computing services.

In 2011, the company changed its name to Microsoft Japan Company, Limited (日本マイクロソフト株式会社, Nihon Maikurosofuto Kabushiki Gaisha).

Microsoft Japan conducted a trial 4-day work week in summer 2019, granting workers paid leave on Fridays. At the same time it cut the length of most meetings from a full hour to half an hour, and capped attendance at five employees. For the duration of the trial, the company reported a 40% increase in productivity and 23% reduction in electricity costs.

== Products ==
=== Microsoft Hagaki Studio ===
Microsoft Hagaki Studio (マイクロソフト はがきスタジオ, Microsoft Postcard Studio) is a discontinued postcard software for printing nengajo (New Year's Day postcard). The software was released only in Japan from 1997 to 2006. It provided the upgrade path from other competitors such as Fudemame (筆まめ) and Fudeoh (筆王), but Microsoft Hagaki Studio 2007 was the last version of the software.

== Events ==
- May 13, 2005 - Yoshihiro Maruyama presented the Xbox 360 to the public.

== Sponsorship ==
From 2004 to 2009 the company sponsored the Microsoft Cup, a knockout rugby football tournament contested by the best Japanese teams from the Top League.
