= IBM Fujisawa =

Subsidiary of IBM Corporation

IBM Fujisawa—located in Fujisawa, Kanagawa, Japan—was a manufacturing and development site of IBM Japan, Ltd., a subsidiary of IBM Corporation.

== Fujisawa manufacturing ==
IBM Fujisawa was established in 1967. As a manufacturing plant, it produced the following products:

- Tabulating machine
- IBM 1440 computer
- IBM System/360 Model 40 computer
- 2701 and other communications controllers

In 1971, manufacturing of System/360, System/370 and IBM 4300 mainframes moved to the newly opened IBM Yasu in Yasu, Shiga,。

- IBM Personal System/55
- IBM ThinkPad
- Harddisk

In December, 2002, as Hitachi Ltd. bought IBM's hard disk division, IBM Fujisawa became the headquarters and the main plant of Hitachi Global Storage Technology.

== Fujisawa development ==
In 1972, the Fujisawa development lab was established in a new building inside the Fujisawa site. It developed the following hardware and software products:

For worldwide

- IBM 3767 - Printer terminal under Systems Network Architecture (1974)
- IBM 3276 - IBM 3270 remote display-controller (1975)
- IBM 3101 - ASCII display terminal (1979)
- Microdrive - Miniature 1-inch hard disk drive (1994)

For Japan and Asia/Pacific

- IBM Kanji System and DBCS solutions to IBM Korea & Taiwan
- IBM 5550 (by the independent business unit absorbed later to development)
- IBM JX (by the independent business unit absorbed later to development)

In 1985, the development lab moved to a new site in Yamato, Kanagawa and was called IBM Yamato development laboratory.

== Access ==
- Fifteen minutes' walk or five minutes' bus ride from Shōnandai Station on Odakyū Enoshima Line

== See also ==
- IBM
- IBM Japan (ja:日本IBM)
- IBM Yamato Facility
- IBM Yasu (ja:日本IBM野洲事業所)
