= IBM PS/55 =

Personal computer series by IBM Japan

Personal System/55

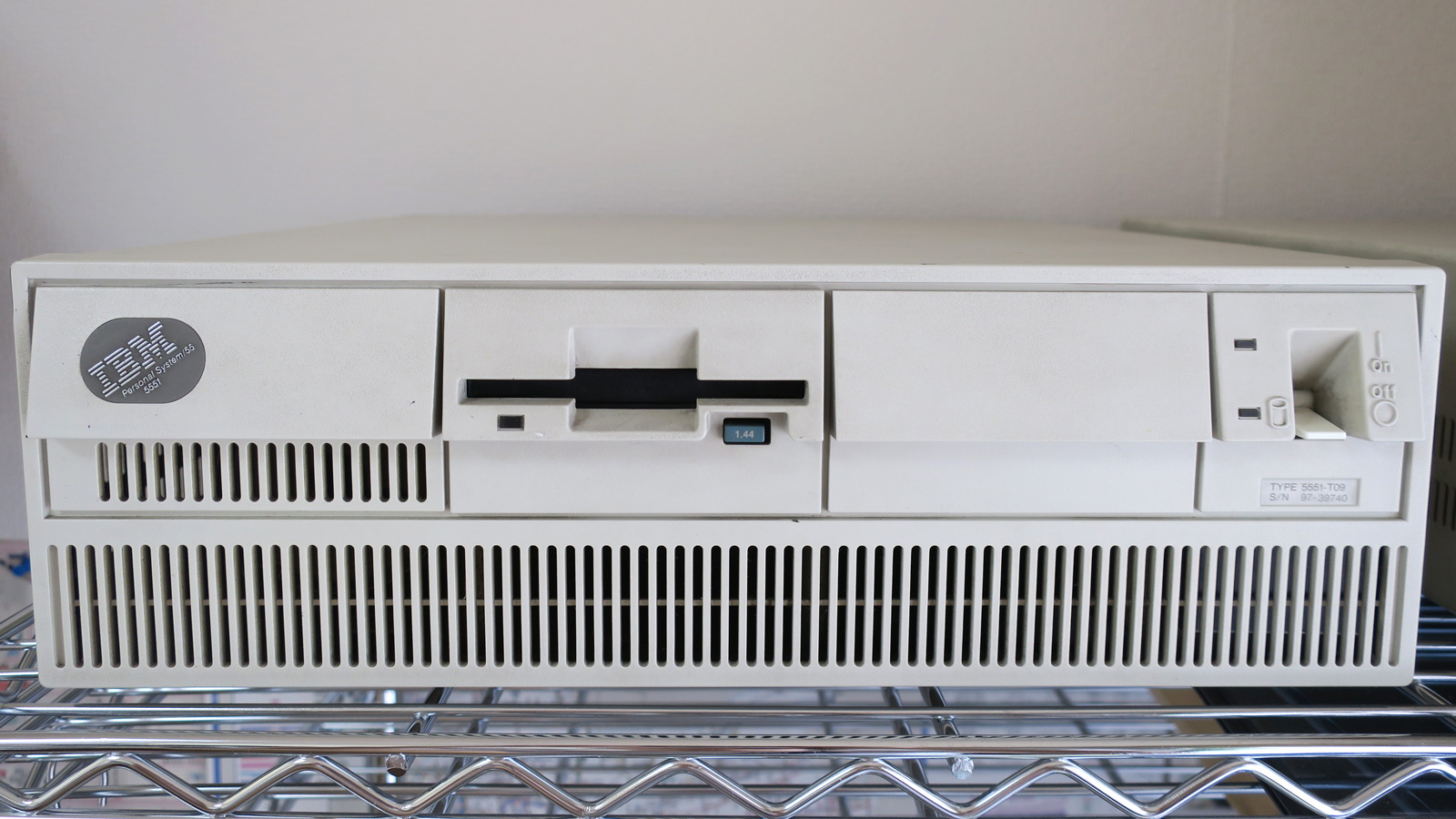
- PS/55 Model 5550-T
- Also known as: パーソナルシステム/55
- Developer: IBM
- Manufacturer: IBM Fujisawa (PS/2 line), Matsushita Electric Industrial (5550 line)
- Type: Professional Computer
- Released: 1987; 39 years ago
- Discontinued: 2001
- Operating system: Japanese DOS (K3.3 - J5.0); PC DOS (3.3 -); DOS/V; OS/2; Windows 3.x
- Display: 1024×768, 16 colors (later models 256 colors)
- Graphics: Display Adapter (later models XGA and VGA)
- Predecessor: IBM 5550; IBM JX

The Personal System/55 (パーソナルシステム/55) or PS/55 is a personal computer series released from IBM Japan in 1987.

The PS/55 is the successor to IBM 5550 (Multistation 5550), but its architecture is based upon IBM PS/2. The first line-up of the series consisted of rebranded 5550 models except the Model 5570-S which was based on the PS/2 Model 80 (IBM 8580). Unlike the PS/2, most PS/55-based models have a 32-bit (80386 or 80486) CPU and Micro Channel (MCA) bus for the high-end business computing market. IBM Japan was hesitating to sell personal computers for consumers because the IBM JX failed. The AT bus model was released for home users in 1991.

Model 5550-T Booting-up

== Features ==
=== Display Adapter ===
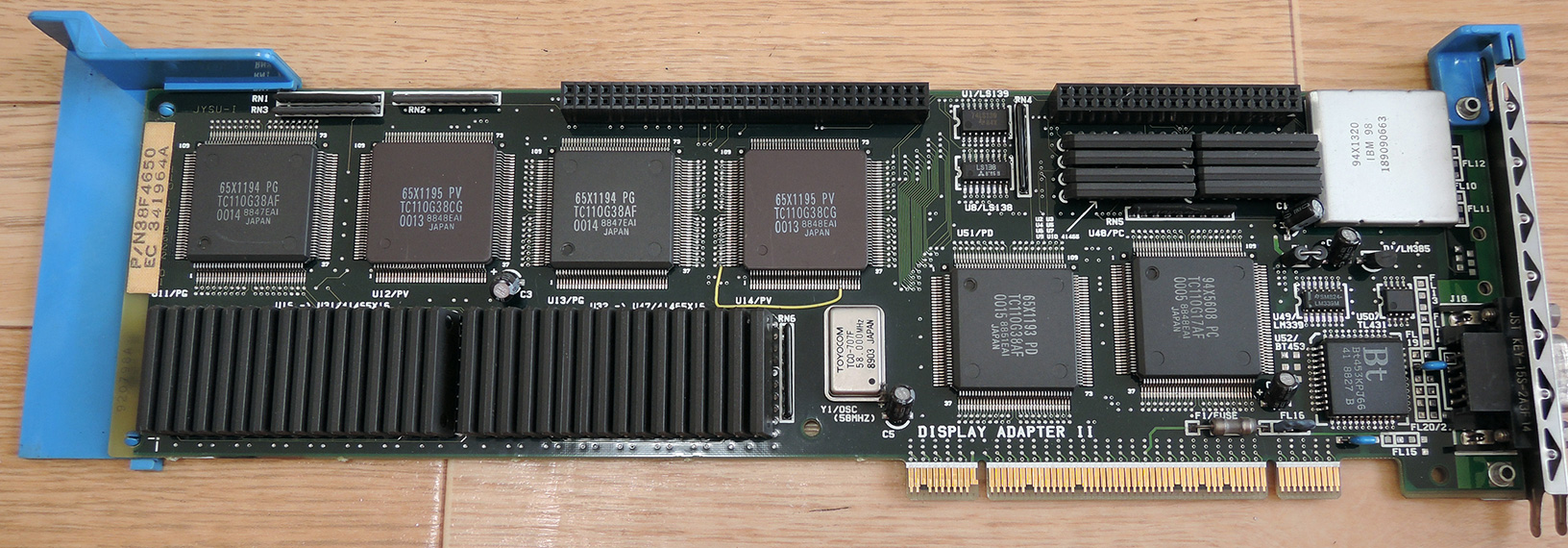
Display Adapter II

The MCA video card called Display Adapter has a Japanese font containing nearly 7,000 glyphs stored in its ROM, which enables PS/2-based computers to display Japanese text without loading the font into memory. Similar to the IBM 5550, the display resolution in character mode is 1040×725 pixels (12×24 and 24×24 pixel Mincho font, 80×25 text) in 8 colors. The graphics mode is 1024×768 pixels in 16 colors. This is the same resolution as 8514/A and XGA/A, but not compatible.

The first Display Adapter was installed in the model 5570-S, also known as the first Micro Channel machine of PS/55. It had a compatibility problem with PS/2 applications. Since the model 5550-S released in 1988, the Display Adapter II that improved the PS/2 compatibility was introduced. In the boot sequence, the Display Adapter enables VGA on the motherboard, and it passes the video signal from the motherboard to adapter's VGA connector. When using Japanese DOS, VGA is disabled, and the Display Adapter switches its video selector from VGA to own video chip. In addition, it added the 256 color mode (1024×768 pixels in 256 colors chosen from 262,144 colors). The adapter has 1 MB of video RAM, and 256 KB of RAM for user-defined characters.

Most PS/2-based models have compatibility with the Display Adapter II. VGA and the following display modes are supported:

- 1040×725 pixels with 80×25 characters in 8 colors or monochrome
- 1024×768 pixels graphics in 16 colors or monochrome
- 1024×768 pixels graphics in 256 of 262,144 colors

Later, XGA and VGA-only models were released. These later machines cannot run the special Japanese DOS, instead requiring the use of DOS/V with software-rendered kanji.

=== JIS layout keyboard ===
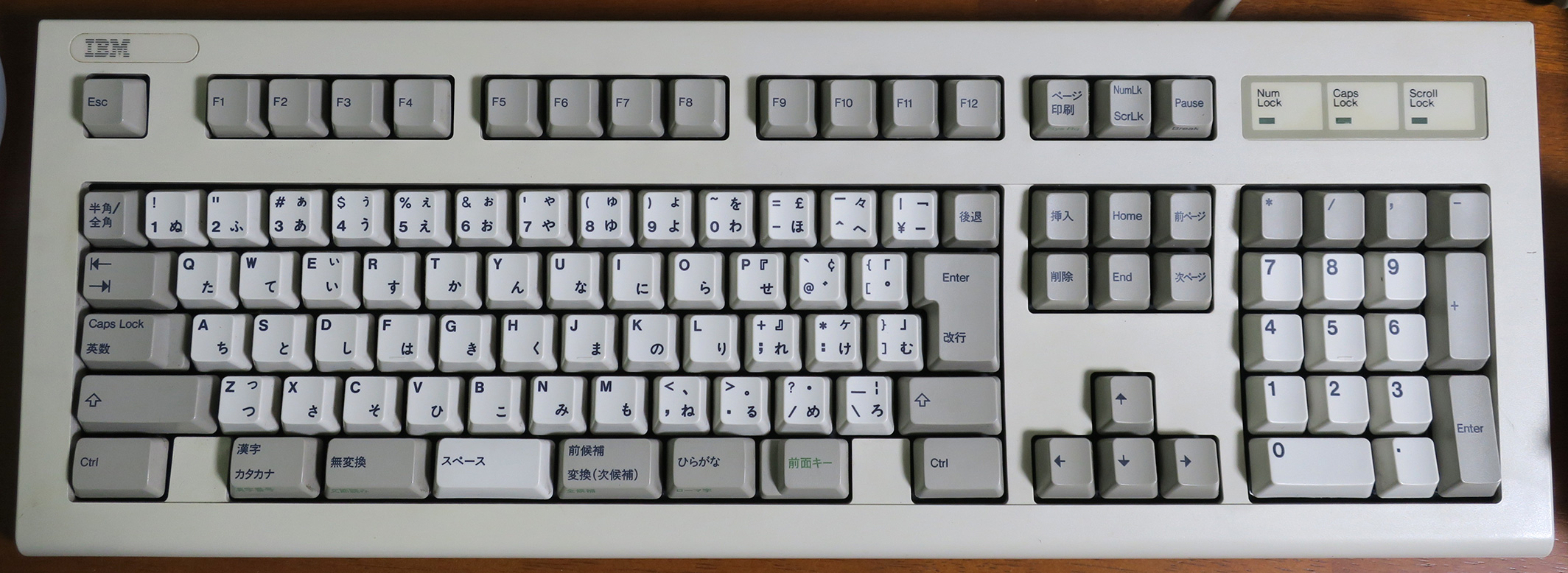
5576-002 Keyboard

The following keyboards have the PS/2 port. These keyboards have new scancode sets (81h, 82h, 8Ah) to support additional keys for Japanese input method.

- 5576-001 - Same layout as 5550 type 1 (5556-001) keyboard.
- 5576-002 - Japanese layout based on 101 Enhanced keyboard, but uses Alps Electric Co. mechanical key switches.
- 5576-003 - Space-saving version of 5576-002
- 5576-A01 - OADG reference keyboard.
- 5576-A01 - OADG reference keyboard.

== Models ==
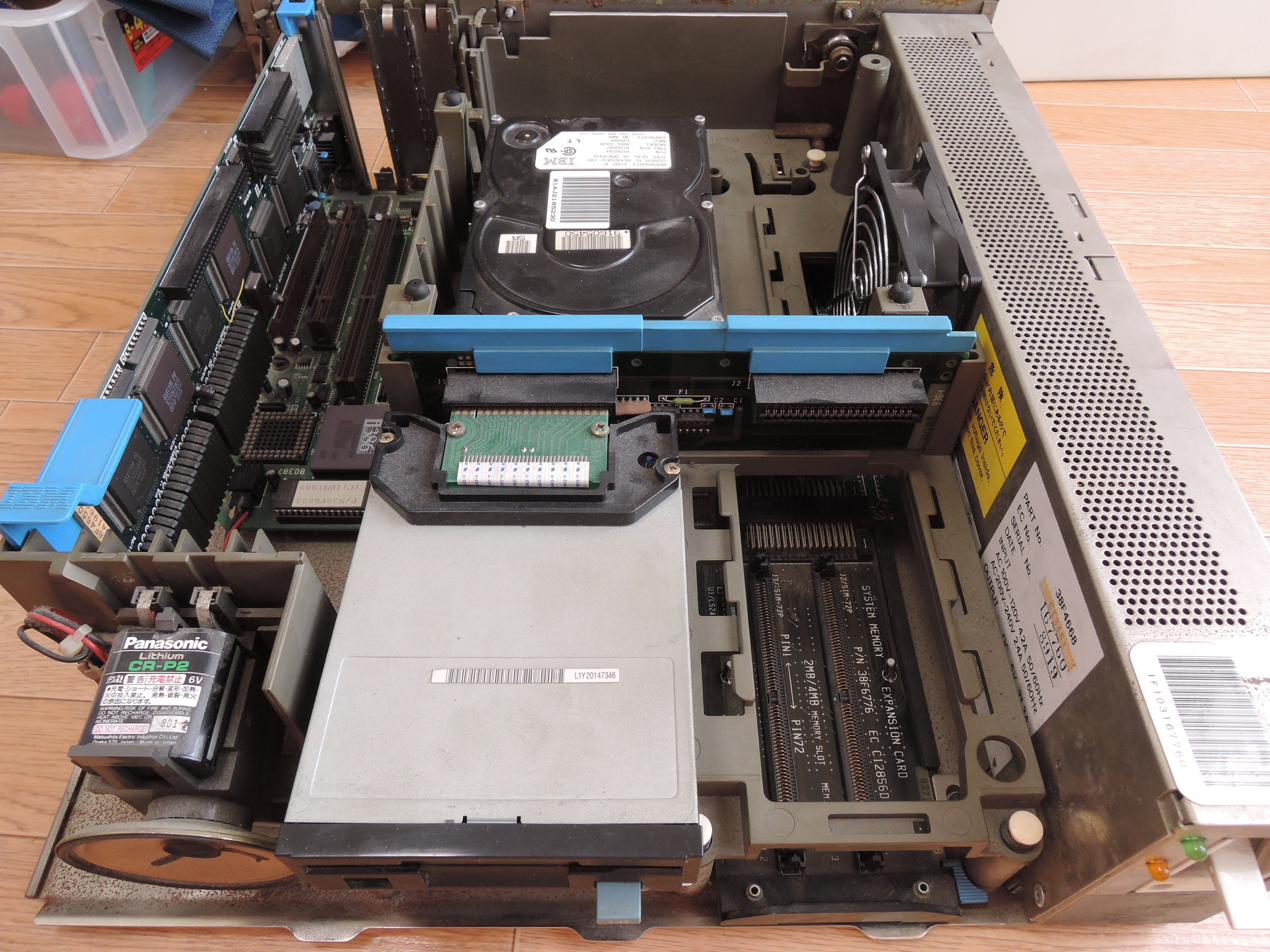
Internal view of Model 5550-T

- Tower
  - 5570-S, T, V (Early tower model. 5570-S, the first model of PS/55, doesn't support English versions of PC DOS and OS/2)
  - 5580-Y, W (Late tower model)
- Business Desktop (Predecessor to IBM PC 300/700 series)
  - 5560-W, N （Hi-end desktop）
  - 5550-S, T, V, W, N, Y, L, R （Mainstream desktop）
  - 5540-T （Low-end desktop）
- For small business, home users
  - 5530-Z, S, T, U, W (Desktop with integrated a display, Predecessor to PS/V Vision)
  - 5510-Z, S, T (VGA model. Predecessor to PS/V)
- Laptop
  - 5545-T (Integrated plasma display)
  - 5535-S (the first model pre-installed DOS/V)
- A4 Notebook
  - PS/55 Note (Predecessor to ThinkPad. AT bus or MCA bus.)
- Rebranded IBM 5550
  - Model G to P (1987-1991)

Year	Name	Model	CPU	Bus	Graphics	Case
1987	PS/55	5570-S	Intel 80386DX 16MHz	MCA	D/A	Tower
1988	PS/55	5550-S	Intel 80386DX 16MHz	MCA	D/A	Desktop
1988	PS/55	5550-T	Intel 80386DX 20MHz	MCA	D/A	Desktop
1988	PS/55	5570-T	Intel 80386DX 20MHz	MCA	D/A	Tower
1989	PS/55	5550-V	Intel 80386DX 25MHz	MCA	D/A	Desktop
1989	PS/55	5570-V	Intel 80386DX 25MHz	MCA	D/A	Tower
1989	PS/55	5530-T	Intel 80386DX 20MHz	MCA	D/A	Desktop with integrated display
1989	PS/55Z	5530Z SX	Intel 80386SX 20MHz	MCA	D/A	Desktop with integrated display
1990	PS/55	5535-S	Intel 80386SX 16MHz	MCA	VGA	Laptop
1990	PS/55	5540-T	Intel 80386SX 20MHz	MCA	D/A	Desktop
1990	PS/55	5545-T	Intel 80386DX 20MHz	MCA	D/A	Integrated Plasma Display
1990	PS/55	5560-W	Intel 80486 25MHz	MCA	D/A	Desktop
1990	PS/55	5580-Y	Intel 80486 33MHz	MCA	D/A	Tower
1991	PS/55Z	5510S	Intel 80386SX 16MHz	AT	VGA	Desktop
1991	PS/55Z	5510T	Intel 80386DX 20MHz	MCA	VGA	Desktop
1991	PS/55Z	5510Z	Intel 80286 12MHz	AT	VGA	Desktop
1991	PS/55note	5523S	Intel 80386SX 12MHz	AT	VGA	Notebook
1991	PS/55	5530-U	Intel 80386SX 20MHz	MCA	XGA	Desktop with integrated display
1991	PS/55	5530-V	IBM 386SLC 20MHz	MCA	D/A	Desktop with integrated display
1991	PS/55	5560-W	Intel 486SX 25MHz	MCA	D/A	Desktop
1991	PS/55	5580-W	Intel 486SX 25MHz	MCA	D/A	Tower
1992	PS/55	5551-W	Intel 486SX 20MHz	MCA	XGA	Desktop
1992	PS/55Z	5530-U	IBM 386SLC 20MHz	MCA	XGA	Desktop with integrated display
1992	PS/55	5530-W	Intel 486SX 20MHz	MCA	XGA	Desktop with integrated display
1992	PS/55	5560-N	Intel 486DX2 66MHz	MCA	XGA	Desktop
1992	PS/55note	9552-Y	IBM 486SLC 25MHz	MCA	VGA	Notebook
1992	PS/55	95 XP 486	Intel 486DX 50MHz	MCA	XGA	Tower
1993	PS/55	5521-Y	Intel 486SX 33MHz	MCA	D/A / SVGA	Desktop
1993	PS/55	5551-L	IBM 486DLC2 66MHz	MCA	D/A / XGA	Desktop
1993	PS/55	5551-N	Intel 486DX2 66MHz	MCA	D/A / XGA	Desktop
1993	PS/55	5551-Y	Intel 486SX 33MHz	MCA	D/A / XGA	Desktop
1993	PS/55 Server	95	Intel Pentium 66MHz	MCA	XGA	Tower
1994	PS/55	5530-L	IBM 486DLC2 66MHz	MCA	D/A / XGA	Desktop with integrated display
1994	PS/55	5551-R	Intel 486DX2 66MHz	MCA	D/A / XGA	Desktop

== Competitors ==
- NEC PC-98, N5200/N5300
- Fujitsu FMR
- Toshiba J-3100
- AX architecture

== Timeline ==
Timeline of the IBM Personal Computer

Asterisk (*) denotes a model released in Japan only

== See also ==
- DOS/V

Preceded by IBM 5550	IBM PS/55; 1987 - 2001	Succeeded by IBM PS/V
Preceded by IBM JX	IBM PS/55; 1987 - 2001	Succeeded by IBM PC Series
Preceded by IBM JX	IBM PS/55; 1987 - 2001	Succeeded by IBM ThinkPad
