= E (PC DOS) =

- Developer: IBM
- Release: June 1993; 33 years ago
- Stable release: 3.13v / 1994-11-17
- Operating system: PC DOS, OS/2
- Platform: IBM PC compatible
- Type: Text editor
- License: Proprietary commercial software

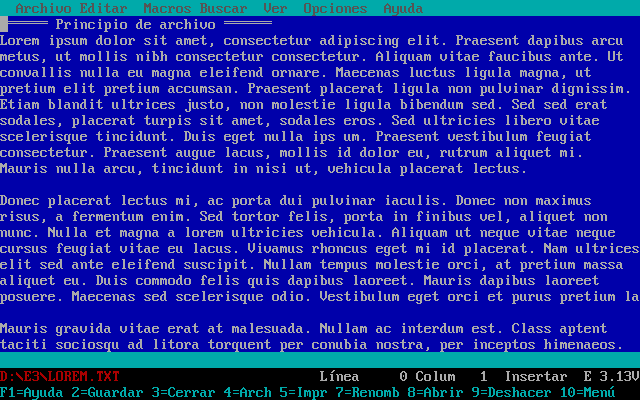
Texteditor E version 3.13V (spanish)

E is the text editor which was made part of PC DOS with version 6.1 in June 1993, in February 1995 with version 7 and later with PC DOS 2000. In version 6.1, IBM dropped QBASIC, which, in its edit mode, was also the system text editor. It was necessary to provide some sort of editor, so IBM chose to adapt and substantially extend its OS/2 System Editor (1986), a minimally functional member of the E family of Editors. The PC DOS version adds wide array of functions. In version 7, IBM added the REXX language to PC DOS, restoring programmability to the basic box. IBM also provided E with OS/2.

== Features ==
The features include (for PC DOS 7):

- online help
- edit large text files
- draw boxes around text
- mouse and menu support
- record and play keystroke macros
- change case within a marked area
- access multiple files in multiple panes
- syntax-directed editing of C and REXX
- add and multiply numbers in a marked area
- locate and make a change globally within a file
- select text and move, copy, overlay, or delete it
- copy and move text from one file into another file

E for PC DOS consists of five files:

- E.EXE -- the executable program itself, (v3.13 in PC DOS 7)
- E.EX -- pre-compiled profile for E's behavior
- E.INI -- text file allowing modification of a few E.EX defaults (Not in v 3.12 (dos 6))
- EHELP.HLP -- text file used for E's F1 key help in Browse (read-only) mode
- BROWSE.COM -- loads a file into E in read-only mode. (Not in v 3.12 (dos 6))

Since no tool was provided for building other profiles besides the supplied E.EX, PC DOS users have limited access to the full extensibility offered by the version 3 of E (e3) available to IBM programmers themselves. Still, it is a implementation with many features supporting the needs of general programmers.

For PC DOS owners who have moved on to other operating systems, E can be run with the use of a DOS emulator (e.g. DOSBox) or with DOS virtualization software (e.g. DOSEMU or NTVDM). E runs quite successfully under the Windows NT 32-bit DOS prompt, for example.

To run the E Editor under OS/2, you must swap the first two directories in PATH statement of AUTOEXEC.BAT. Put the E files in \OS2\MDOS directory. E v3.12 was also supplied in OS/2 PPC edition.

== E family ==
The history of the PC DOS version of E begins with Personal Editor, a key configurable editor that enabled limited programming using a GML-like language. Personal Editor was initially released in 1982 and became an IBM product not long after.

Limitations in Personal Editor led to the development and release in 1984 of the E editor, a much faster editor that supported very long files and included a substantially enhanced user interface. E2, released in 1985, provided enhanced programmability using a REXX-like language. Its UI programmability was designed so flexibly that it was used to develop user interface prototypes for other kinds of software, including Word Processors and Survey software. Subsequent versions, including E3, EOS2, and EPM, provided a wide range of other enhancements. The OS/2 System Editor was developed by the E programming team at the request of the OS/2 Development team. It was designed to be a fast and highly functional text editor with a minimal number of features and no configurability. EPM was later released as the OS/2 Enhanced Editor. The popular SlickEdit shares a common heritage, having been written by the original developer of E3. Other versions of E family editors have been released with IBM programming products. There are several acknowledged E editor family clones, including X2, which both reproduces the Rexx-like EI programming language used in E2 and later versions of E and acknowledges its debt in its documentation.

== See also ==
- MS-DOS Editor
