= Digital do MaiN =

Japanese audio engineering company

- Native name: デジタルドメイン株式会社
- Company type: Private
- Industry: Audio electronics
- Founder: Kazuhiko Nishi
- Headquarters: Chiyoda, Tokyo, Japan
- Area served: Worldwide
- Key people: Yasunori Mochida (Chairman); Kazuhiko Nishi (President); Tamotsu Kajiwara (CEO)
- Products: Power and Compact Amplifiers; Super Audio CD; D/A Converters; Loudspeakers
- Website: www.digital-do-main.co.jp (in Japanese)

Digital do MaiN (Japanese: デジタルドメイン株式会社, Dezitaru do MēiN Kabushiki Gaisha) is a Japanese audio engineering company headquartered in Chiyoda, Tokyo, Japan. The company name emphasises symbiosis of analog and digital technologies (implemented, for example, in a volume control subsystem); the logo symbolizes an input pin jack (left square), output pin jack (right square) and an innovative signal processing unit in between.

== Technology ==
Digital do MaiN's power amplifiers use V-FET technology transistors. Initially developed by Nippon Gakki Seizo K.K. in the 1970s (US Patent 4,216,038), the technology was improved, and the 2SK77B transistor was released. As V-FET devices are no longer manufactured, Digital do MaiN builds them itself. Original design and usage of the 2SK77B V-FET transistor give amplifiers characteristics similar to vacuum tube devices and Triode class A amplifiers which feature very high quality of output sound and cancellation of most of the even distortion harmonics, and allow noise distortion to be less than 0.005% and no loss of original harmonics. Digital do MaiN also uses technologies and complementary products from its partners: MSB Technology's (USA) DACs, Cabasse (France) loudspeakers, Denon (Japan) waveform reproduction technology.

== Awards ==
- Japanese Audio Excellence Award 2009, Separate Digital Players category (D-1a D/A converter) and Main Amplifiers category (B-1a power amplifier)
