= AX architecture =

Japanese computing initiative to allow PCs to handle Japanese text

Advert of an AX machine

AX (Architecture eXtended) was a Japanese computing initiative starting in around 1986 to allow PCs to handle double-byte (DBCS) Japanese text via special hardware chips, whilst allowing compatibility with software written for foreign IBM PCs.

== History ==
The idea was conceived by Kazuhiko Nishi before he resigned his position as vice president of Microsoft. Microsoft Japan took over the project, and in July 1987 the Preparatory Committee of the AX Consortium started developing its specification.

The AX Consortium officially started in October 1987, including ASCII Corporation, Sony, Hitachi, Sharp, Oki, Casio, Canon, Kyocera, Sanyo, Mitsubishi Electric, etc., but notably excluding Toshiba and Fujitsu (who were hence the 'opposition').

At that time, NEC PC-9801 was the dominant PC architecture in the Japanese PC market because IBM PC/AT and its clone PCs could not display Japanese text. However, NEC did not tolerate PC-9801 compatible machines and was fighting court battles with Epson which was the only PC-9801 compatible machine vendor. Therefore, other vendors desperately needed a standard specification for Japanese capable PCs.

Eventually two standards were developed: JEGA and AX-VGA.

Due to less available software and its higher cost compared to the PC-9801 series, AX failed and was not able to break into the market in Japan. The Nikkei Personal Computing journal reported in 1989 that only 18 out of 36,165 PCs used in 937 companies were AX machines, and 90% of companies had no plan to purchase the AX machine.

In 1990, IBM Japan unveiled DOS/V which enabled IBM PC/AT and its clones to display Japanese text without any additional hardware using a standard VGA card. Soon after, AX disappeared and the decline of NEC PC-9801 began.

=== AX architecture machines ===
Several companies released AX computers:

- Oki Electric Industry if386AX30 / 50 series
- Casio Computer AX-8000D / 8000L
- Canon Axi DX-20 / 20P / 10 / 10P
- Kyocera AX386 model A
- Sanyo Electric MCB-17 /18 series
- Sharp AX286D / 286L / AX386 ( MZ-8000 )
- Sony Quarter L (PCX-300 series)
- Acer ACER1100 / 1200 / 1170
- NCR PC-AXL / PC-AX32
- Hitachi FLORA 3010 / 3020 series
- Mitsubishi Electric MAXY (M3201 / M3202 / M3205)
- Yokogawa-Hewlett-Packard Vectra-AX series

== JEGA ==
JEGA
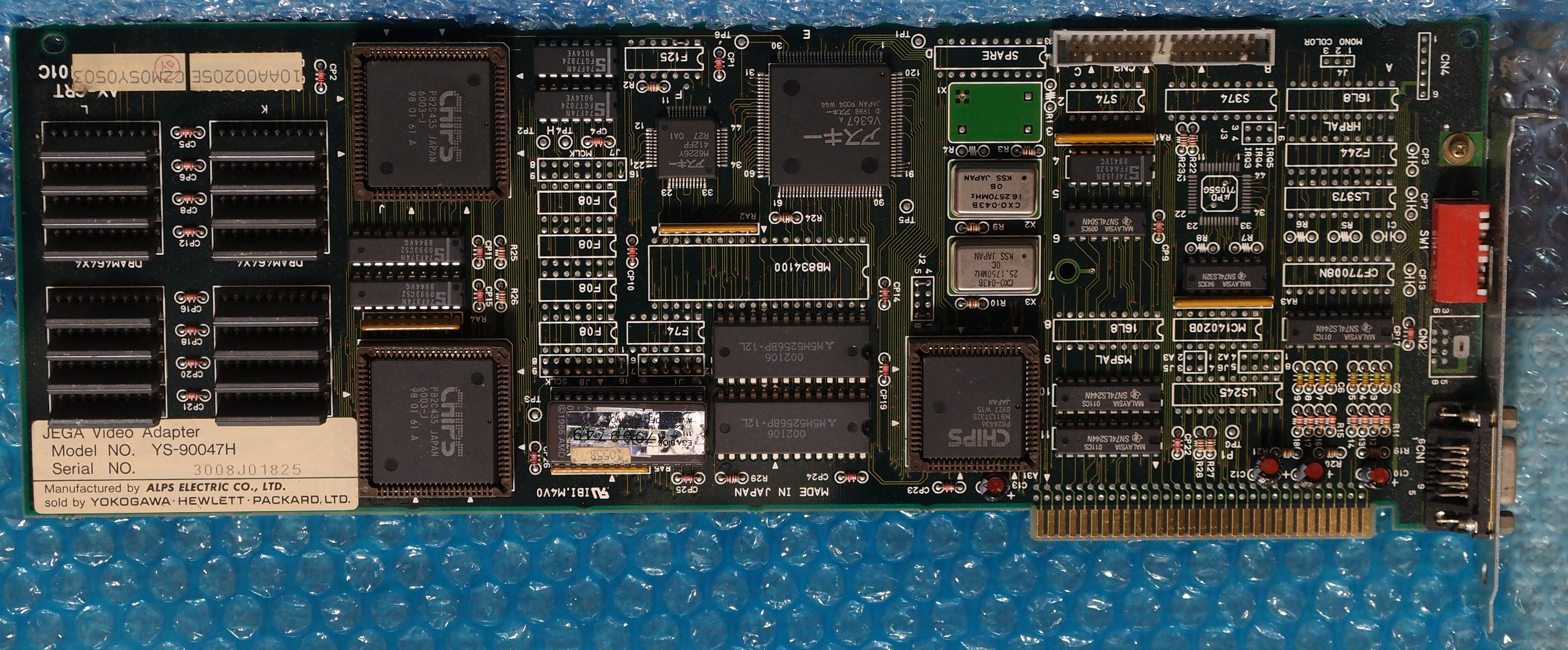
- Release date: 1987; 39 years ago
- Designed by: ASCII, Chips & Technologies
- Architecture: P82C435 and V6367

History
- Predecessor: EGA

To display Kanji characters with sufficient clarity, AX machines had JEGA screens with a resolution of 640 × 480 rather than the 640 × 350 standard EGA resolution prevalent elsewhere at the time. JEGA was developed jointly by ASCII and Chips & Technologies, combining the P82C435 and V6367 video chips. Users could typically switch between Japanese and English modes by typing JP and US, which would also invoke the AX-BIOS and an IME enabling the input of Japanese characters.

In addition to the modes provided by EGA, JEGA supports the following display modes as standard:

- 80 × 25 character text display, effective resolution 640 × 480 pixels, 8 pages: overwrites modes 2h (graphic screen and overlaid display) and 3h of EGA;
- 640 × 480 pixels graphics: 1 page or 1 page overlaid with text screen.

== AX-VGA ==
IBM released the VGA standard soon after AX was introduced. Since the AX architecture was not compatible with the new standard, the AX consortium had to design a VGA compatible chipset.

This was called AX-VGA and could be implemented in two ways:

- AX-VGA/H, a hardware implementation based on the AX-BIOS;
- AX-VGA/S, a software emulation.

Development of the AX-VGA chipset was delayed, and its first implementation came out in 1991. By that time, DOS/V was already available, allowing standard IBM PC compatibles to display Japanese text using a VGA card. The need for AX was gone and further developments were discontinued.

== See also ==
- DOS/V
- Shift JIS
- PC Open Architecture Developers' Group (OADG)
