= DOS/V =

Variant of PC DOS/MS-DOS developed for Japan

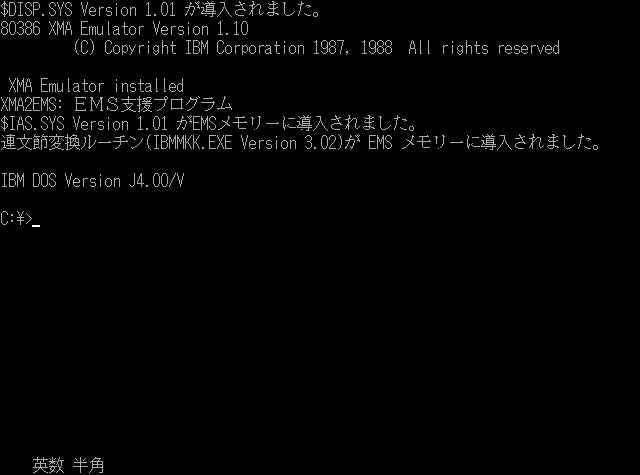
- Screenshot of IBM DOS J4.0/V
- Developer: IBM and Microsoft
- Written in: Assembly language, C
- OS family: DOS
- Working state: No longer supported
- Source model: Closed source
- Initial release: November 1990; 35 years ago
- Latest release: PC DOS 2000 / July 1998; 28 years ago
- Available in: Japanese, Chinese, Korean
- Supported platforms: x86
- Kernel type: Monolithic kernel
- Default user interface: Command-line interface
- License: Commercial proprietary software

DOS/V is a Japanese computing initiative starting in 1990 to allow DOS on IBM PC compatibles with VGA cards to handle double-byte (DBCS) Japanese text via software alone. It was initially developed from PC DOS by IBM for its PS/55 machines (a localized version of the PS/2), but IBM gave the driver source code to Microsoft, who then licensed a DOS/V-compatible version of MS-DOS to other companies.

Kanji fonts and other locale information are stored on the hard disk rather than on special chips as in the preceding AX architecture. As with AX, its great value for the Japanese computing industry is in allowing compatibility with foreign software. This had not been possible under NEC's proprietary PC-98 system, which was the market leader before DOS/V emerged. DOS/V stands for "Disk Operating System/VGA" (not "version 5"; DOS/V came out at approximately the same time as DOS 5). In Japan, IBM compatible PCs became popular along with DOS/V, so they were often referred to as "DOS/V machine" or "DOS/V pasocom" even though DOS/V operating systems are no longer common by the late 1990s.

The promotion of DOS/V was done by IBM and its consortium called PC Open Architecture Developers' Group (OADG). Digital Research released a Japanese DOS/V-compatible version of DR DOS 6.0 in 1992.

== History ==
In the early 1980s, IBM Japan developed two x86-based personal computer lines for the Asia-Pacific region: the IBM 5550 and IBM JX. The 5550 read Kanji fonts from the disk and displayed text as graphic characters on a 1024 × 768-resolution monitor. The JX, meanwhile, was extended from the IBM PCjr, with support for English and Japanese versions of PC DOS and a display resolution of 720 × 512. Neither machine could break the dominance of NEC's PC-98 line in Japan. Due to the 5550's high price, it was mostly purchased by large enterprises that were already customers of IBM's mainframe computers. The JX was also given an Intel 8088 processor instead of the faster 8086 as IBM thought the consumer-class JX should not surpass a business-class 5550, which damaged its reputation among consumers. Software companies also said that IBM was uncooperative when it came to developing software for the JX. IBM Japan planned a 100% PC/AT compatible machine codenamed "JX2", but cancelled it in 1986.

Masahiko Hatori was one of the developers for the JX's variant of PC DOS. Through the development of the JX, he learned the skills needed to localize an English computer into Japanese. In 1987, he started developing DOS/V at the IBM Yamato Development Laboratory during his spare time. He thought the newly-introduced Video Graphics Array (VGA) card, which supported resolutions as high as 640 × 480, and a fast i386 processor could realize his idea. However, both were prohibitively expensive at the time. At the same time, Toshiba released the J-3100 laptop computer, and Microsoft introduced the AX architecture, which IBM Japan declined to participate in. Hatori's boss, Tsutomu Maruyama, believed IBM's upper management would not allow the adoption of the AX architecture because they had asked IBM Japan to use the same standards as the rest of the world. In October 1987, IBM Japan released the PS/55 Model 5535, a proprietary laptop using a special version of DOS. It was more expensive than the J-3100 because its LCD used a non-standard 720 × 512 resolution. Hatori thought IBM needed to shift its own proprietary PC to IBM PC compatibles. Maruyama and Nobuo Mii believed Japan's closed PC market needed to be changed, and that this could not be done by IBM alone. In the summer of 1989, they decided to carry out the development of DOS/V, disclose the architecture of PS/55, and found the PC Open Architecture Developers' Group (OADG).

The DOS/V development team designed DOS/V to be simple for better scalability and compatibility with the original PC DOS. They had difficulty reducing text drawing time. "A stopwatch was a necessity for DOS/V development", Hatori said.

IBM Japan announced the first version of DOS/V, IBM DOS J4.0/V, on 11 October 1990, and shipped it in November 1990. At the same time, IBM Japan released the PS/55 Model 5535-S, a laptop computer with VGA graphics. The announcement letter stated DOS/V was designed for low-end desktops and laptops of PS/55, but users reported on BBSes that they could run DOS/V on other PC compatibles. The development team unofficially confirmed these comments and modified incompatibilities of DOS/V. It was a secret within the company because it would affect PS/55 sales and be met with opposition. Hatori said,

We hid the fact that DOS/V could run on other IBM compatible machines. We successfully got it working on machines made by Gateway and other companies. However, we had to keep it secret and prevent it from spreading, as many in the company would have opposed it. In short, it was a double-edged sword. If DOS/V could run on cheap clone machines, the 5550, which was highly profitable, may see its sales decline. In fact, 80% of the staff at the Yamato office were against it.

Maruyama and Mii had to convince IBM's branches to agree with the plan. At the beginning of December 1990, Maruyama presented his plan, "The low-end PC strategy in Japan," to IBM's Management Committee. At the committee, a topic usually took 15 minutes, but his topic took an hour. The plan was finally approved by John Akers.

After the committee, Susumu Furukawa, one of the presidents of Microsoft Japan, met with IBM Japan to share the source code for DOS/V. On 20 December 1990, IBM Japan announced the foundation of the OADG and that Microsoft would supply DOS/V to other PC manufacturers. From 1992 to 1994, many Japanese manufacturers began selling IBM PC clones with DOS/V. Some global PC manufacturers entered the Japanese market, such as Compaq in 1992 and Dell in 1993. Fujitsu, who owned the FM Towns line of proprietary PC-based computers, began releasing their own DOS/V machines (the FMV series) in October 1993, and about 200,000 units were shipped in 1994.

The initial goal of DOS/V was to enable Japanese software to run on laptop computers based on the IBM global standards rather than the domestic computer architecture. In 1989, computers with VGA graphics were not common, but they expected that LCD panels with VGA resolution would be affordable within a few years. DOS/V lacked an extensive software library, so IBM Japan requested third-party companies to port their software to it. The PS/55 Model 5535-S was released as a laptop terminal for the corporate sector. They only had to supply a few major business software for DOS/V.

In March 1991, IBM Japan released the PS/55note Model 5523-S, a lower-priced laptop computer. It was a strategically important product to popularize DOS/V into the consumer market, and led to the success of subsequent consumer products such as the ThinkPad. However, DOS/V itself sold much better than the 5523S because advanced users purchased it to build a Japanese language environment on their IBM compatible PCs.

In 1992, IBM Japan released the PS/V (similar to the PS/ValuePoint) and the ThinkPad. They were based upon an architecture closer to PC compatibles, and intended to compete with rivals in the consumer market. By December 1992, the PS/V was the best-selling DOS/V computer. In January 1993, NEC released a new generation of the PC-98, the PC-9821, to take back its initiative. NEC advertised that the scrolling speed of the word processor Ichitaro on the PC-9801BX was faster than on the PS/V 2405-W. Yuzuru Takemura of IBM Japan said,

Let's suppose the movement towards Windows is inevitable. Processors and graphics cards will become faster and faster. If the PC-98 continues to use its own architecture, it will never beat our machines in speed. Windows is developed for the PC/AT architecture. Kanji glyphs can be supplied as a software font. The only thing IBM has to do is adapt it for the video card. It is much harder to adapt Windows to a different architecture.

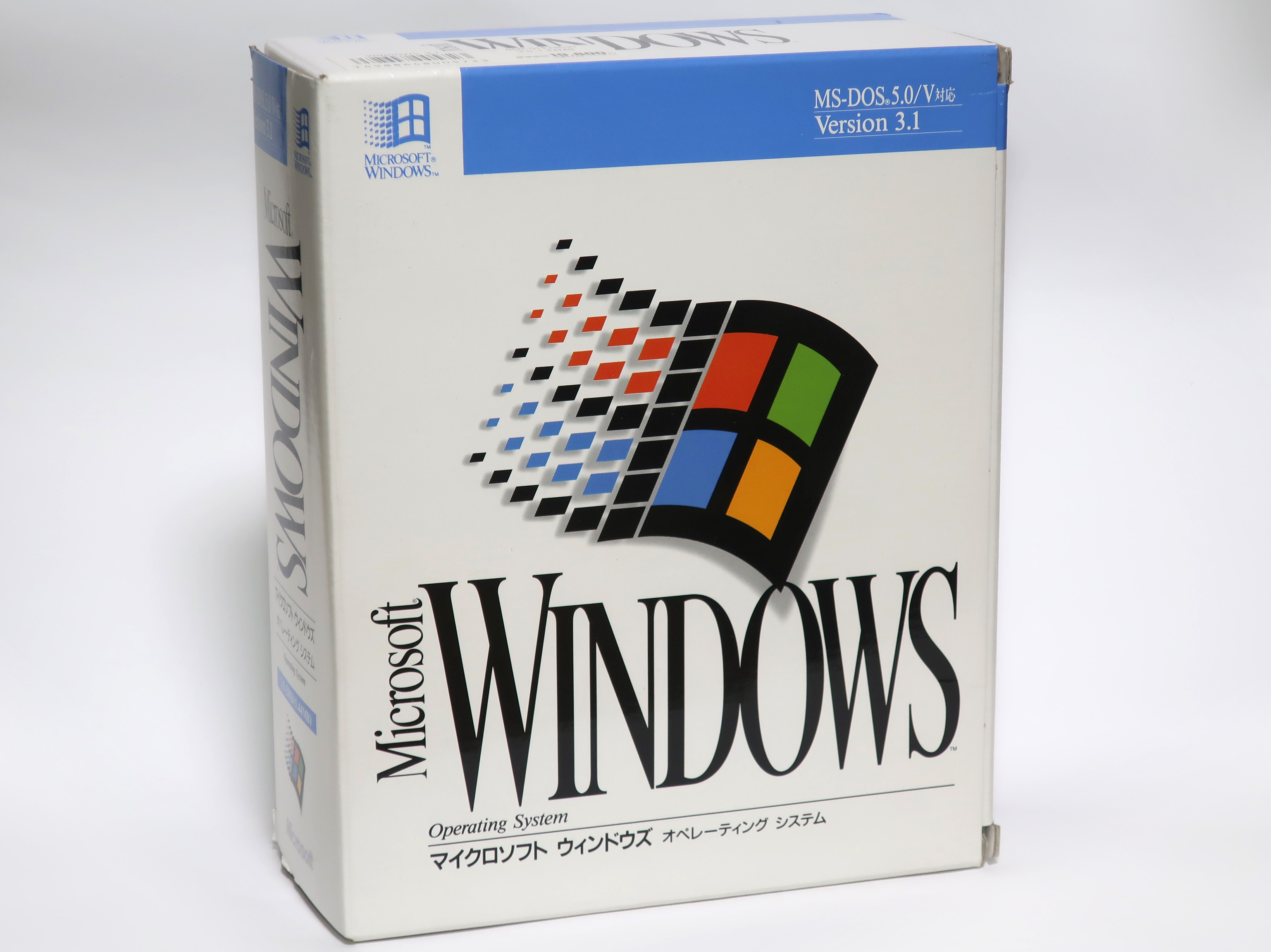
Windows 3.1 for MS-DOS 5.0/V

In 1993, Microsoft Japan released the first Japanese versions of Windows (Windows 3.1) for both DOS/V and PC-98. DOS/V contributed to the dawn of IBM PC clones in Japan, though the PC-98 still kept 50% of market share until 1996, when sales declined after the release of Windows 95.

== Drivers ==
Three device drivers enable DBCS code page support in DOS on IBM PC compatibles with VGA; the font driver, the display driver and the input assisted subsystem driver. The font driver loads a complete set of the glyphs from a font file into the extended memory. The display driver sets the 640×480 graphics mode on the VGA, and allocates about 20 KB of the conventional memory for text, called the simulated video buffer. A DOS/V program writes the codes of the characters to the simulated video buffer through DOS output functions, or writes them directly and calls driver's function to refresh the screen. The display driver copies the font bitmap data from the extended memory to the actual video memory, corresponding to the simulated video buffer. The input assisted subsystem driver communicates with optional input methods and enables the text editing in the on-the-spot or below-the-spot styles. Without installing these drivers, the DOS/V is equivalent to the generic MS-DOS without DBCS code page support.

- $FONT.SYS – Font driver
- $DISP.SYS – Display driver
- $IAS.SYS – Input assist subsystem (IAS) with front end processor (FEP) support driver
- $PRN.SYS – Printer driver
- $PRNUSER.SYS – Printer driver
- $PRNESCP.SYS – Printer driver for Epson ESC/P J84

== Versions ==
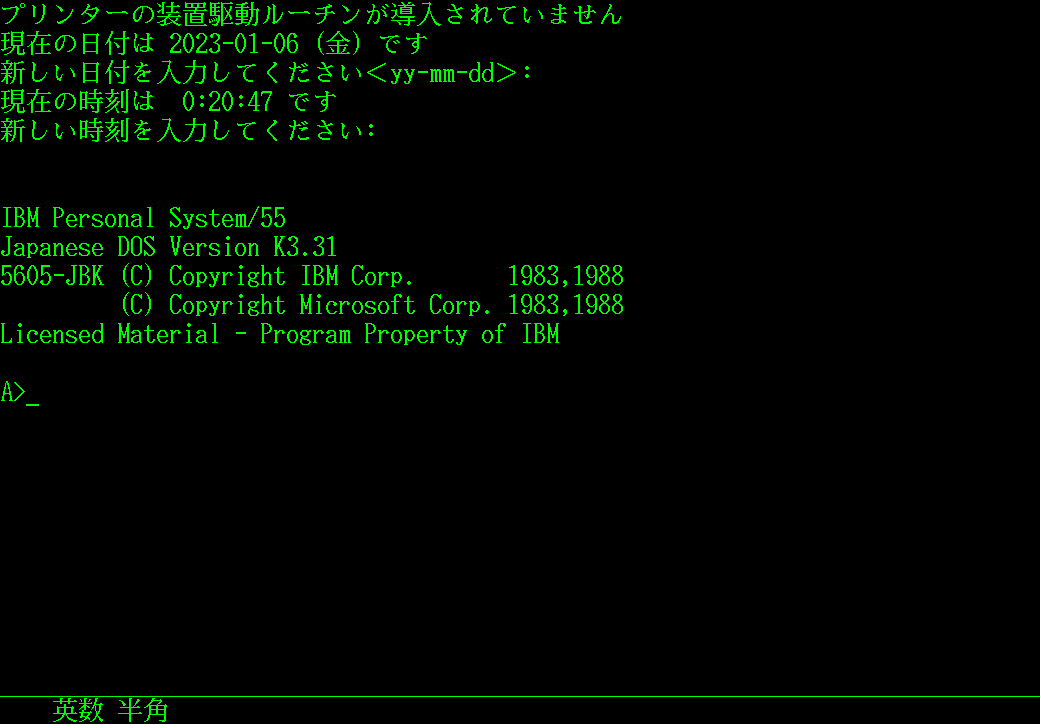
IBM Japanese DOS K3.3

In 1988, IBM Japan released a new model of the PS/55 which was based on the PS/2 with Japanese language support. It is equipped with a proprietary video card, the Display Adapter, which has a high resolution text mode and a Japanese character set stored in a ROM on the card. It supports Japanese DOS K3.3, PC DOS 3.3 (English) and OS/2.

IBM DOS J4.0 was released in 1989. It combines Japanese DOS and PC DOS, which runs Japanese DOS as the Japanese mode (PS/55 mode) and PC DOS as the English mode (PS/2 mode). Although it had two separated modes that needed a reboot to switch between them, IBM Japan called it bilingual. This version requires the PS/55 display adapter.

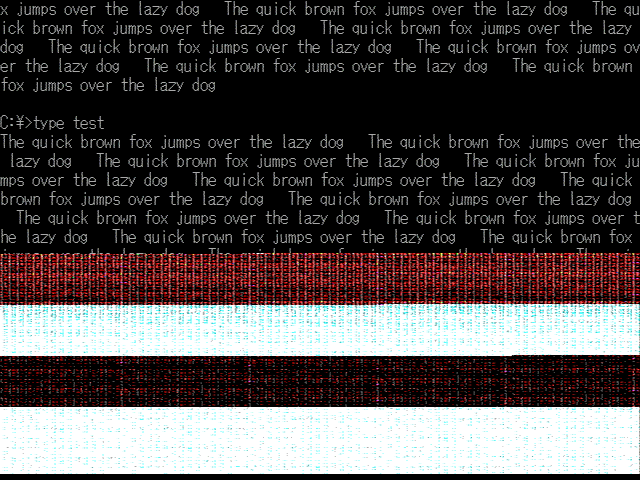
Screen tearing with Paradise SVGA

The first version of DOS/V, IBM DOS J4.0/V (J4.05/V), was released in the end of 1990. The word 'DOS/V' was quickly known to Japanese computer industry, but the DOS/V itself didn't spread quickly. As of 1991, some small companies sold American or Taiwanese computers in Japan, but DOS J4.0/V caused some issues on PC compatibles. Its EMS driver only supports IBM's Expanded Memory Adapter. The input method doesn't support the US keyboard nor the Japanese AX keyboard, so it locates some keys at the wrong place. PS/55 keyboards were available from IBM, but it must be used with an AT to PS/2 adapter because AX machines (thus PC/AT clones) generally have the older 5-pin DIN connector. Scrolling text with the common Tseng Labs ET4000 graphics controller makes the screen unreadable. This issue can be fixed by the new /HS=LC switch of $DISP.SYS in DOS J4.07/V. "Some VGA clones did not correctly implement the CRTC address wraparound. Most likely those were Super VGAs with more video memory than the original VGA (i.e. more than 256 KB). Software relying on the address wraparound was very rare and therefore the functionality was not necessarily correctly implemented in hardware. On the other hand, the split screen technique was relatively well documented and well understood, and commercial software (especially games) sometimes used it. It was therefore likely to be tested and properly implemented in hardware."

IBM Japan released DOS J5.0/V in October 1991, and DOS J5.0 in December 1991. DOS J5.0 combines Japanese DOS and DOS/V. This is the last version developed for the PS/55 display adapter. DOS J5.02/V was released in March 1992. It added official support for the IBM PS/2 and the US English layout keyboard.

The development of MS-DOS 5.0/V was delayed because IBM and Microsoft disputed how to implement the API for input methods. It took a few months to make an agreement that the OEM adaptation kit (OAK) of MS-DOS 5.0/V provided both IAS (Input Assist Subsystem) and MKKC (Microsoft Kana-Kanji Conversion). Microsoft planned to add the AX application support into DOS/V, but cancelled it because its beta release was strongly criticized by users for lacking compatibility. Some PC manufacturers couldn't wait Microsoft's DOS/V. Toshiba developed a DOS/V emulator that could run DOS/V applications on a VGA-equipped J-3100 computer. AST Research Japan and Sharp decided to bundle IBM DOS J5.0/V. Compaq developed own DOS/V drivers, and released their first DOS/V computers in April 1992.

On 10 December 1993, Microsoft Japan and IBM Japan released new versions of DOS/V, MS-DOS 6.2/V Upgrade and PC DOS J6.1/V. Although both were released at the same time, they were separately developed. MS-DOS 6.2/V Upgrade is the only Japanese version of MS-DOS released by Microsoft under its own brand for retail sales. Microsoft Japan continued selling it after Microsoft released MS-DOS 6.22 to resolve patent infringement of DoubleSpace disk compression.

IBM Japan ended support for PC DOS 2000 on 31 January 2001, and Microsoft Japan ended support for MS-DOS on 31 December 2001.

Japanese versions of Windows 2000 and XP have a DOS/V environment in NTVDM. It was removed in Windows Vista.

=== PC DOS versions ===
PC DOS versions of DOS/V (J for Japanese, P for Chinese (PRC), T for Taiwanese, H for Korean (Hangul)):

- IBM DOS J4.0/V "5605-PNA" (version 4.00 – 4.04 were not released for DOS/V)
  - IBM DOS J4.05/V for PS/55 (announced 1990-10-11, shipped 1990-11-05)
  - IBM DOS J4.06/V (1991-04)
  - IBM DOS J4.07/V (1991-07)
- IBM DOS J5.0/V "5605-PJA" (1991-10), IBM DOS T5.0/V, IBM DOS H5.0/V
  - IBM DOS J5.02/V for PS/55 (1992-03)
  - IBM DOS J5.02A/V
  - IBM DOS J5.02B/V
  - IBM DOS J5.02C/V
  - IBM DOS J5.02D/V (1993-05)
  - Sony OADG DOS/V (includes IBM DOS J5.0/V and drivers for AX machines)
- PC DOS J6.1/V "5605-PTA" (1993-12), PC DOS P6.1/V, PC DOS T6.10/V
  - PC DOS J6.10A/V (1994-03)
- PC DOS J6.3/V "5605-PDA" (1994-05)
  - PC DOS J6.30A/V
  - PC DOS J6.30B/V
  - PC DOS J6.30C/V (1995-06)
- PC DOS J7.0/V "5605-PPW" (1995-08), PC DOS P7/V, PC DOS T7/V, PC DOS H7/V
  - PC DOS J7.00A/V
  - PC DOS J7.00B/V
  - PC DOS J7.00C/V (1998-07)
- PC DOS 2000 Japanese Edition "04L5610" (1998-07)
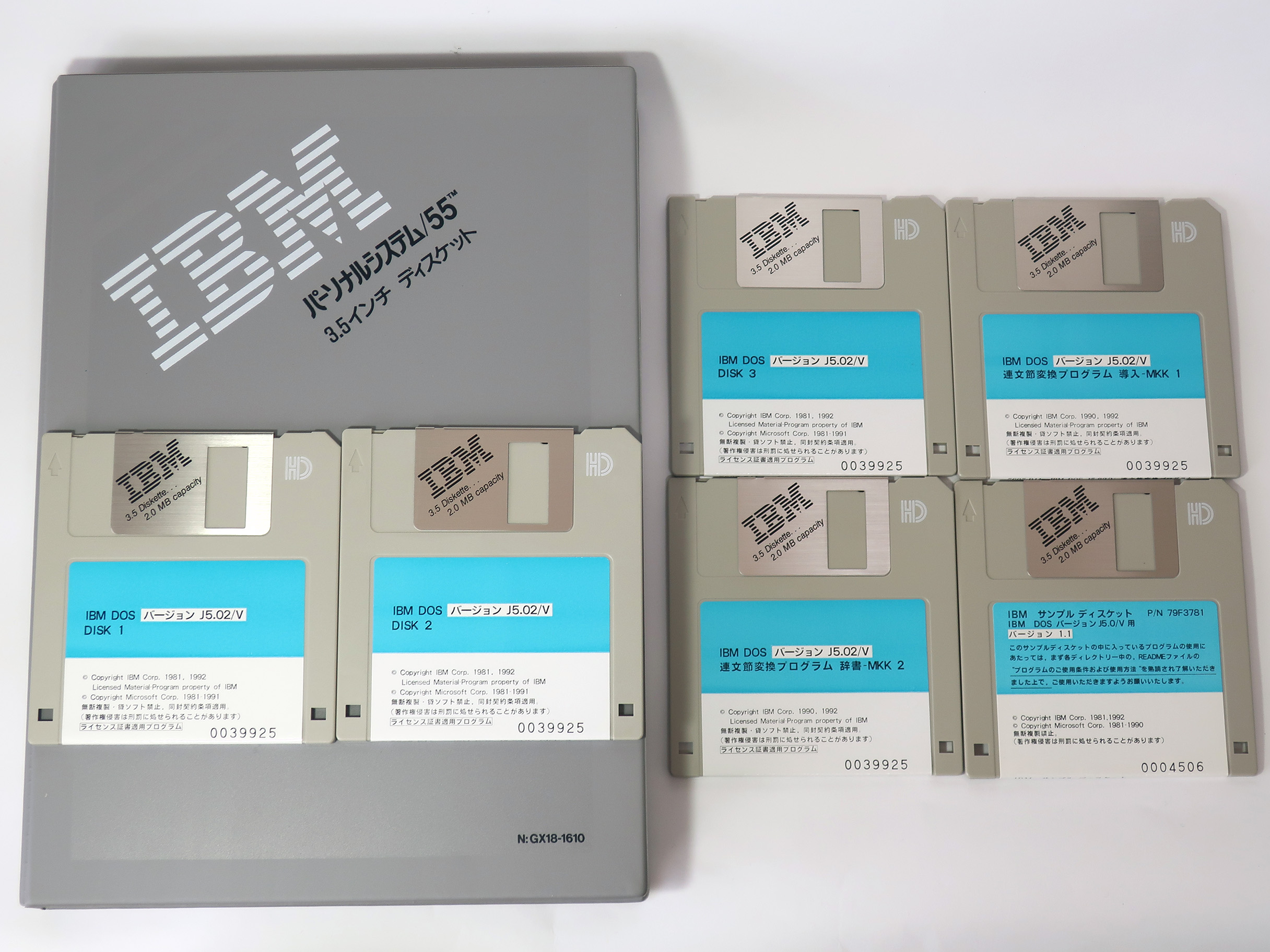
IBM DOS J5.02/V

=== MS-DOS versions ===
MS-DOS versions of DOS/V:

- Toshiba Nichi-Ei (日英; Japanese-English) MS-DOS 5.0
- Compaq MS-DOS 5.0J/V (1992-04)
- MS-DOS 5.0/V (OEM, generic MS-DOS 5.0/V)
- MS-DOS 6.0/V
- MS-DOS 6.2/V (Retail, 1993-12)
- MS-DOS 6.22/V (1994-08)
- Fujitsu Towns OS for FM Towns (only late issues had DOS/V compatibility added)
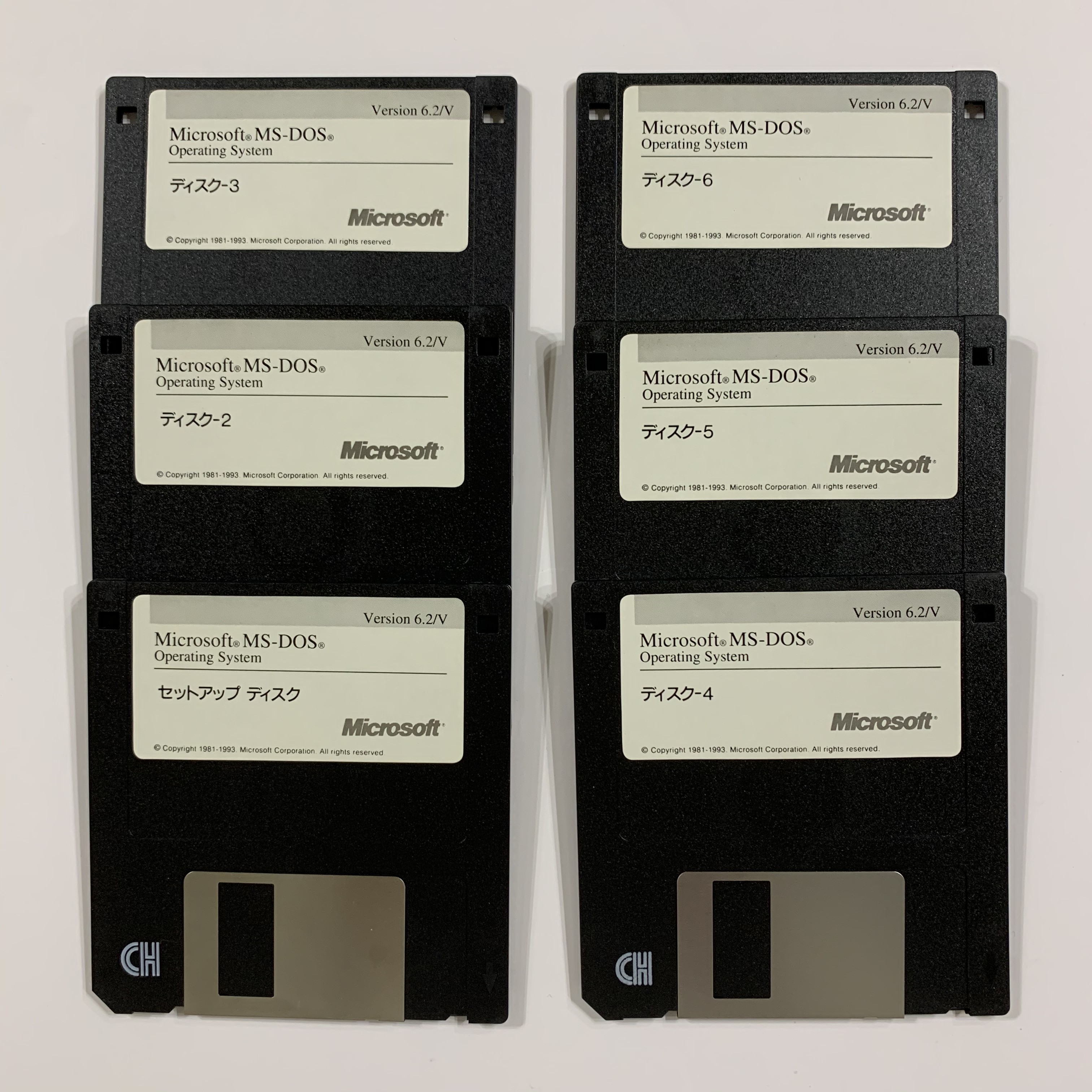
Japanese MS-DOS 6.2/V floppy disks

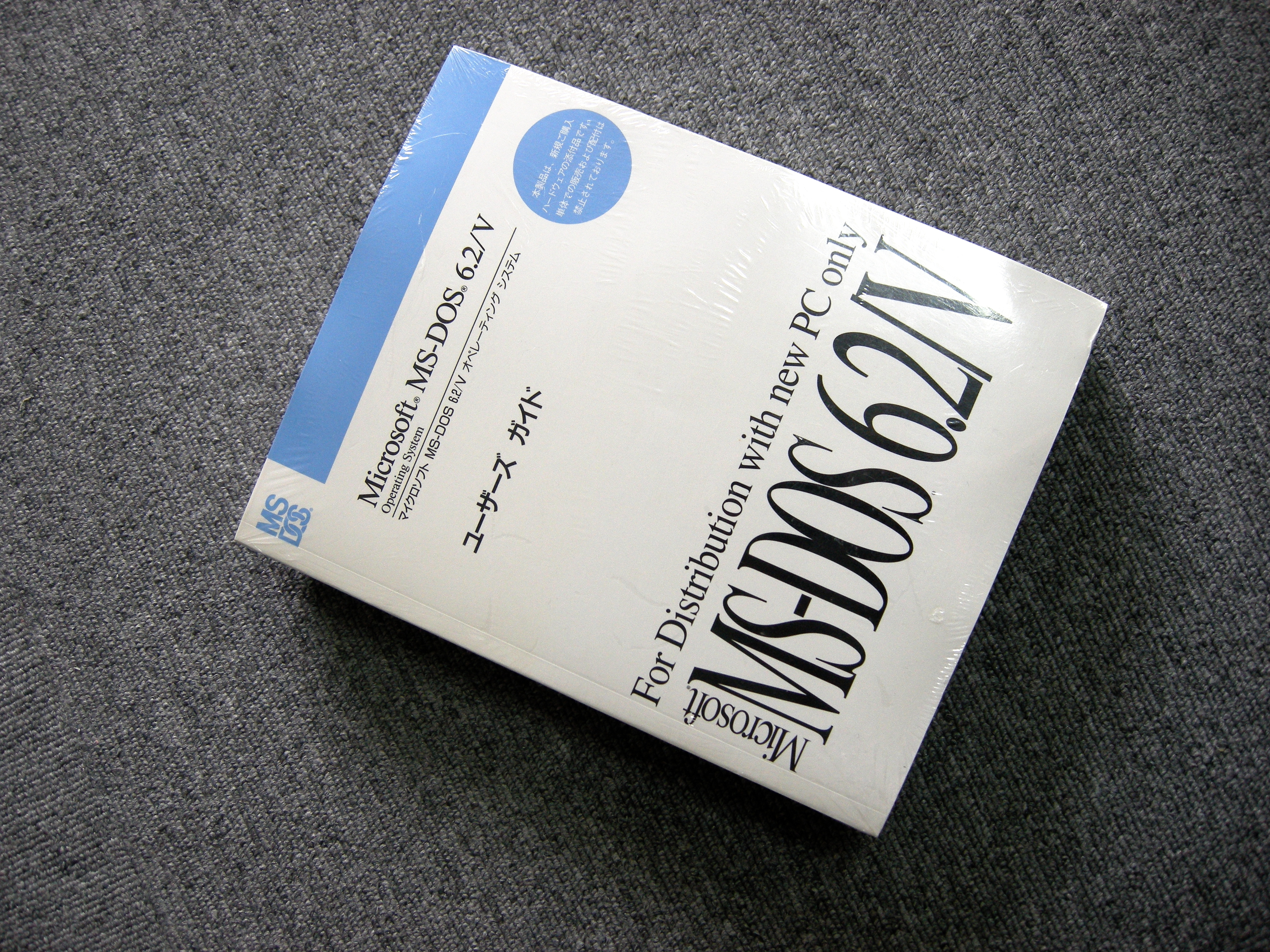
MS-DOS 6.2/V user's guide

=== DR DOS versions ===
DR DOS versions of DOS/V:

- DR DOS 6.0/V (Japanese) (1992-07), (Note: Japanese and Korean issues of the DR DOS ANSI.SYS driver contain support for a number of special arguments to switch to Japanese video modes and toggle between Korean and English input modes.) DR DOS 6.0/V (Korean)
  - ViewMAX 2 (Japanese) (1991–1992)
  - NetWare Lite 1.1J (Japanese) (1992–1997) (Note: A Japanese version of Novell NetWare Lite named "NetWare Lite 1.1J" existed for four Japanese platforms: DOS/V, Fujitsu FM-R, NEC PC-98/Epson PC and Toshiba J-3100. DOS/V-related updates were distributed by Novell as DOSV6.EXE, DOSV.EXE, TSBODI.LZH and were supported up to 1997.)
- Novell DOS 7 (Japanese)? (Note: A Japanese version of Novell DOS 7 was announced and is referred to in various English documents, but was apparently never released.)
  - Personal NetWare J 1.0 (Japanese) (1994–1995) (Note: A Japanese version of Novell Personal NetWare 1.0 named "Personal NetWare J" existed for four Japanese platforms: DOS/V, Fujitsu FM-R, NEC PC-98/Epson PC and Toshiba J-3100, some of which were distributed by CONTEC. DOS/V-related updates were distributed by Novell as P10J0?.EXE (with ? replaced by 1 - 5), PNDOSV2.EXE, PNDOSV1.LZH and were supported up to 1995.)
- (DR-DOS 7.0x/V) (2001–2006) (an attempt to build a DR-DOS/V from existing components)

=== Extensions ===
IBM DOS/V Extension extends DOS/V drivers to set up a variety of text modes for certain video adapters. The High-quality Text Mode is the default 80 columns by 25 rows with 12×24 pixels large characters. The High-density Text Mode (Variable Text; V-Text) offers large text modes with various font sizes. DOS/V Extension V1.0 included drivers for VGA, XGA, PS/55 Display Adapter, SVGA (800×600) and ET4000 (1024×768). Some of its drivers were included in PC DOS J6.1/V and later.

- IBM DOS/V Extension V1.0 (1993-01) includes V-Text support
- IBM DOS/V Extension V2.0 "5605-PXB"

== See also ==
- Unicode
- List of DOS commands
- Kanji CP/M-86 (1984)
- DOS/V Power Report (A Japanese magazine on IBM clones)
