= ASCII (magazine) =

Japanese microcomputer magazine

- The first issue (July 1977)
- Categories: Computer magazine
- Frequency: Monthly
- Publisher: ASCII Publishing (–1982); ASCII (–2008); Kadokawa Group Publishing
- Total circulation: 170,000 (1999)
- Founder: Kazuhiko Nishi
- First issue: 18 June 1977; 49 years ago
- Final issue Number: 23 August 2008; 373
- Country: Japan
- Based in: Minami-Aoyama, Tokyo (founded)
- ISSN: 0386-5428

Business ASCII
- Frequency: Monthly
- Publisher: ASCII Media Works
- Total circulation: 19,400 (Sep. 2009)
- First issue: 24 September 2008; 17 years ago
- Final issue Number: 23 January 2010; 390
- ISSN: 1884-0914

ASCII (アスキー) was a monthly released microcomputer magazine in Japan, published by ASCII Corporation from 1977. It targeted business users who used a personal computer in their home and office, but it sometimes introduced computer games and computer music. It was also known as the Monthly ASCII (月刊アスキー) written along with the title from Vol. 2 No. 4, and distinguish with the Weekly ASCII (週刊アスキー) founded in 1997. The ASCII was rebranded as the Business ASCII (ビジネスアスキー) in 2008, and ceased in 2010. Its news website and the Weekly ASCII are continuing as in 2016.

Login, a computer game magazine, was first published as an extra issue of the ASCII in 1982, and the Famitsu (ファミ通) was branched from the Login.

== Foundation ==
Japanese PC Shipments by bit designs 1983–1993

In 1976, NEC released the TK-80, a single-board computer kit, and it became popular among hobbyists in Japan. Kazuhiko Nishi (西 和彦) joined foundation of the first Japanese microcomputer magazine I/O (ja) as an editor when he was a student at the Waseda University. The I/O initially served information for assembled microcomputer systems with a few video game columns. Growing the video game market, it was shifted to a video game magazine. Against it, Nishi considered that personal computers must have far more potential than video games.

In April 1977, Nishi left the company, borrowed money from his grandmother and visited the West Coast Computer Faire held in San Francisco. Then, he realized the difference between Japan and the United States. "In Japan, the TK-80 just caused a microcomputer craze. While in the United States, it seems the beginning of the personal computer revolution. Each persons try to face a personal computer, based on their own identity," he said.

On May 24, 1977, Nishi founded ASCII Publishing Corporation (株式会社アスキー出版) with his friends, Keiichiro Tsukamoto (塚本 慶一郎) and Akio Gunji (郡司 明郎). They published the ASCII as a microcomputer magazine for business, while the I/O was for hobbyists. The first issue sold 5,000 copies. It became one of the most popular computer magazine in 1980s in Japan. In 1999, the magazine reached its largest circulation of 170,000 copies.
