= ASCII Corporation =

Publishing company based in Tokyo, Japan

- Native name: 株式会社アスキー
- Romanized name: Kabushiki-gaisha Asukī
- Type: Subsidiary
- Industry: Video games
- Predecessor: ASCII Corporation (original)
- Founded: November 18, 2002; 23 years ago
- Founder: Kazuhiko Nishi; Akio Gunji; Keiichiro Tsukamoto
- Defunct: March 31, 2008; 18 years ago
- Fate: Merged with MediaWorks
- Successor: ASCII Media Works
- Headquarters: Chiyoda, Tokyo, Japan
- Area served: Japan
- Key people: Kiyoshi Takano (president); Tatsuo Sato (chairman)
- Products: Derby Stallion series; RPG Maker series; Monthly ASCII; MSX
- Revenue: ¥433 million (2006)
- Number of employees: 197 (2006)
- Parent: CSK Corporation (majority stake, 1997-2002); MediaLeaves (2002-2004); Kadokawa Group Holdings (2004-2008)
- Subsidiaries: Astro Arts; Soft Wing
- Website: ascii.jp ascii.jp (archived)
- Footnotes "Company Profile" (in Japanese). ASCII Corporation. 2006. Archived from the original on February 17, 2008.

ASCII Corporation, Ltd. (Note: Japanese: 株式会社アスキー, Hepburn: Kabushiki kaisha Asukī) was a Japanese publishing company based in Chiyoda, Tokyo. It was founded in 1977, originating as the Japanese sales office of Microsoft, though its partnership with the company ended in 1986 upon the formation of Microsoft Japan.

The company then became a subsidiary of Kadokawa Group Holdings in 2004, and merged with another Kadokawa subsidiary MediaWorks on April 1, 2008, becoming ASCII Media Works. The company published Monthly ASCII as the main publication. ASCII is best known for creating the Derby Stallion video game series, the MSX computer, and the RPG Maker line of programming software.

== History ==
=== 1977–1990: Founding and first projects ===
ASCII was founded in 1977 by Kazuhiko Nishi, Akio Gunji and Keiichiro Tsukamoto. The name was taken from the ASCII code that was referred to a computer character set. Originally the publisher of a magazine with the same name, ASCII, talks between Bill Gates and Nishi led to the creation of Microsoft's first overseas sales office, ASCII Microsoft, in 1978. In 1980, ASCII made 1.2 billion yen of sales from licensing Microsoft BASIC. It was 40 percent of Microsoft's sales, and Nishi became Microsoft's Vice President of Sales for Far East. In 1983, ASCII and Microsoft introduced the MSX, a standardized specification for 8-bit home computers. In 1984, ASCII entered the semiconductor business, followed by a further expansion into commercial online service in 1985 under the brand of ASCII-NET. As the popularity of home video game systems soared in the 1980s, ASCII became active in the development and publishing of software and peripherals for popular consoles such as the Family Computer and Mega Drive. After Microsoft's public stock offering in 1986, Microsoft founded its own Japanese subsidiary, Microsoft Co., Ltd., traded as Microsoft Kabushiki Kaisha (MSKK), and dissolved its partnership with ASCII. At around the same time, the company was also obliged to reform itself as a result of its aggressive diversification in the first half of the 1980s. The company went public in 1989.

=== 1989–2000: Satellites and later projects ===
ASCII's revenue in its fiscal year ending March 1996 was 56 billion yen, broken down by sectors: publications (52.5% or 27.0 billion yen), game entertainment (27.8% or 14.3 billion yen), systems and semiconductors (10.8% or 6 billion yen) and others. Despite its struggles to remain focused on its core businesses, the company continued to suffer from accumulated debts, until an arrangement was made that CSK Corporation would execute a major investment into ASCII in 1997.

In the mid-1990s, ASCII acquired the company Something Good, and renamed it to ASCII Something Good, through which it developed three Sega Saturn games: AI Shogi (1995), AI Igo (1997), AI Shogi 2 (1998).

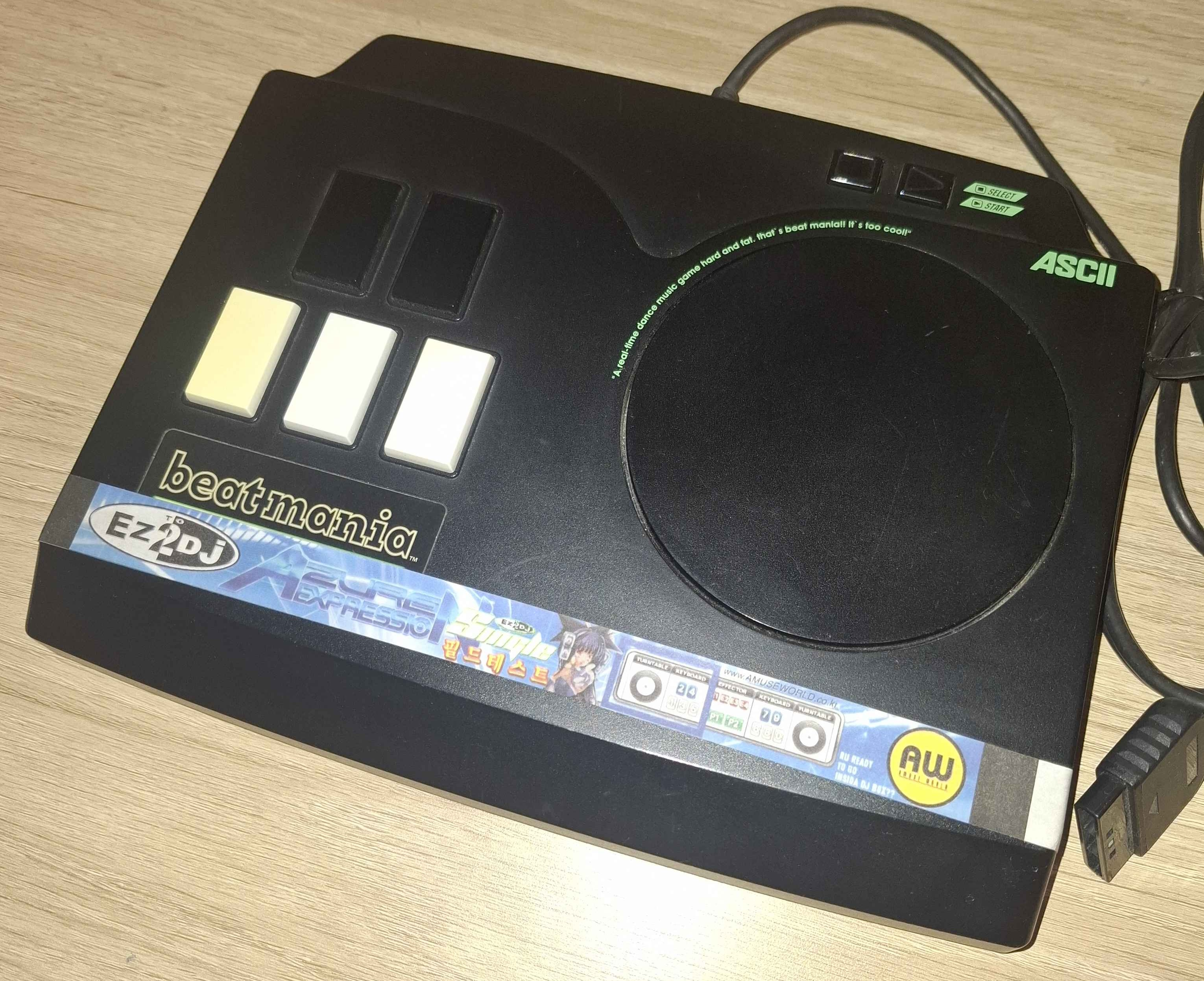
Controller for the PS1 releases of Beatmania, released by ASCII Corporation in 1998

In 1998, ASCII signed an exclusive agreement with Konami to produce third-party controllers for the PlayStation releases of the arcade rhythm game Beatmania. The controllers, known as the ASC-0515BM were often bundled alongside the game. With Konami's official controller for the game, the DJ Station Pro positioned as a more premium option.

ASCII originally used the name Nexoft on early American releases. In 1991, it renamed Nexoft to ASCII Entertainment, although releases around this time used the Asciiware name. To focus on supporting the interactive entertainment channel in America, startup company Agetec (for "Ascii Game Entertainment Technology") was spun off as an independent corporation in 1998 and later became a fully independent publisher one year later. Co-founder Tsukamoto had left ASCII to create a company of his own in 1992, named Impress.

=== 2000–2008: Ownership changes and dissolution ===
On November 26, 2001, CSK Corporation and Unison Capital Partners L.P. announced the approval of transferring the control of its subsidiary ASCII to Unison Capital Partners L.P., effective on March 30, 2002, as part of a strategy to focus CSK's operations on B2B enterprises. The transfer was approved on December 21, 2001. As a part of deal, ASCII's outstanding debt owed to CSK was forgiven, and under Unison's control, the ASCII's Enterbrain and IT publishing divisions would maintain autonomy, while ASCII was restructured to concentrate on PC and IT publishing businesses.

On May 28, 2002, Unison Media Partners announced ASCII became a fully owned subsidiary of via share exchange, and ASCII would be delisted, effective on October 1, 2002. On November 18, 2002, the Astroarts subsidiary was renamed to ASCII, while ASCII was renamed to MediaLeaves. The former Astroarts subsidiary would inherit the publishing business of the former ASCII. On January 29, 2004, Unison Capital Partners, L.P. announced the sale of ASCII's parent company MediaLeaves to Kadokawa Group Holdings, to be completed in March 2004.

On September 27, 2007, Kadokawa Group Holdings announced the merger between subsidiaries MediaWorks and ASCII under the name ASCII Media Works, effective on April 1, 2008. The merger was approved in 2008. On January 10, 2010, the formerly named ASCII company MediaLeaves was merged into Enterbrain, dissolving the last of the ASCII entity.

== Products ==
=== MSX ===
MSX is a standardized home computer architecture, announced by Microsoft and ASCII on June 16, 1983. It was conceived and marketed by Kazuhiko Nishi, then vice-president at Microsoft Japan and director at ASCII Corporation. Nishi conceived the project as an attempt to create unified standards among various home computing system manufacturers of the period. MSX systems were popular in Japan and several other countries. It is difficult to determine how many MSX computers were sold worldwide, but eventually, 5 million MSX-based units were sold in Japan alone. Despite Microsoft's involvement, few MSX-based machines were released in the United States. Before the great success of Nintendo's Family Computer, MSX was the platform for which major Japanese game studios such as Konami and Hudson Soft produced video games. The Metal Gear series, for example, was first written for MSX hardware.

== See also ==
- List of magazines published by ASCII Media Works
