= IBM 5550 =

Series of PCs by IBM, marketed primarily in; Japan, Taiwan, Korea and China

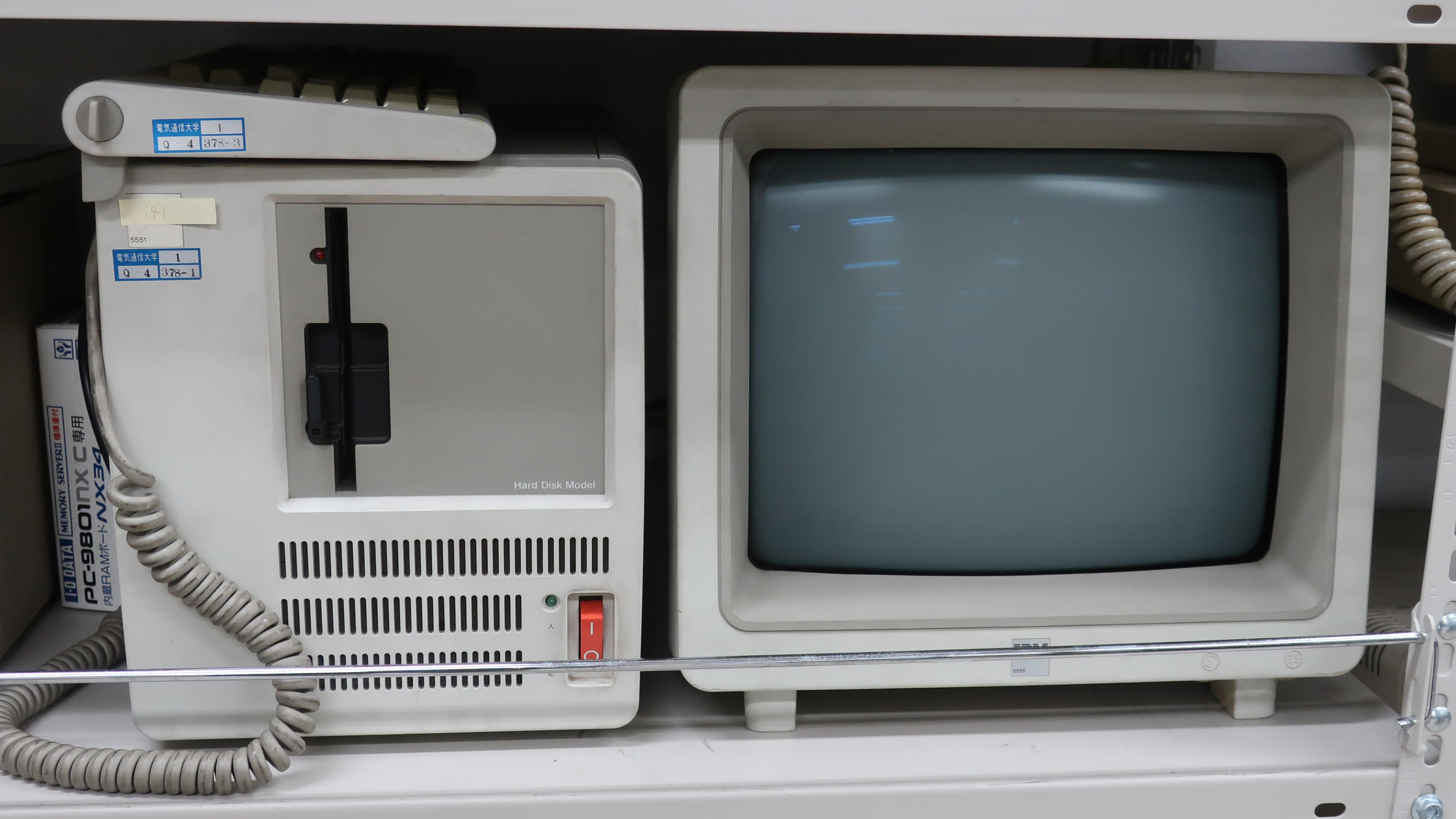
- Also known as: Multistation 5550
- Developer: IBM
- Manufacturer: Matsushita Electric Industrial
- Type: Personal computer
- Released: Japan March 1983; 43 years ago
- Introductory price: US$4,200−10,000 with screen, printer, and keyboard.
- Operating system: DOS or OS/2
- CPU: Intel 8086 @ 8 MHz
- Memory: 256 kB RAM (expandable to 512 kB)
- Display: 15-inch CRT display (41×25 text with full-width characters)
- Graphics: 1024×768 graphics monochrome or 360×512 in four colors
- Predecessor: IBM System/23 Datamaster
- Successor: IBM PS/55; IBM JX
- Made in: Japan

IBM 5540, 5550, 5560 – Japanese-language advert in ASCII, July 1986 issue

IBM 5550 is a personal computer series that IBM marketed in Japan, Korea, Taiwan and China in the 1980s and 1990s, for business use customers. In Japan, it was introduced in 1983 and promoted as "Multistation 5550 (マルチステーション5550)" because it had three roles in one machine: a PC, a word processing machine which was traditionally marketed as a machine different from a PC in Japan, and an IBM-host attached terminal.

== General ==
The IBM PC that had been marketed by IBM since 1981, using Intel 8088, was not powerful enough to process the far eastern languages of Japanese, Korean and Chinese. Nor was the resolution of IBM PC's display high enough to show the complex characters of these languages.

The IBM 5550 was first introduced in Japan in March 1983, using Intel 8086 microprocessor and was called "Multistation 5550" because it had three roles in one machine: a PC, a word processing machine which was traditionally marketed in Japan as a machine different from a PC, and an online terminal.

After the Japanese 5550 models, Korean, Traditional Chinese and Simplified Chinese models were also introduced. IBM 5550 initially used its own architecture, but, later since 1987, was changed to use IBM Personal System/2's Micro Channel Architecture, being renamed as Personal System/55.

In Japan, Kiyoshi Atsumi, a film actor, was used to promote the 5550. IBM later introduced IBM JX for home users in Japan, Australia and New Zealand, and DOS/V for both business and home users in Japan.

== Features ==
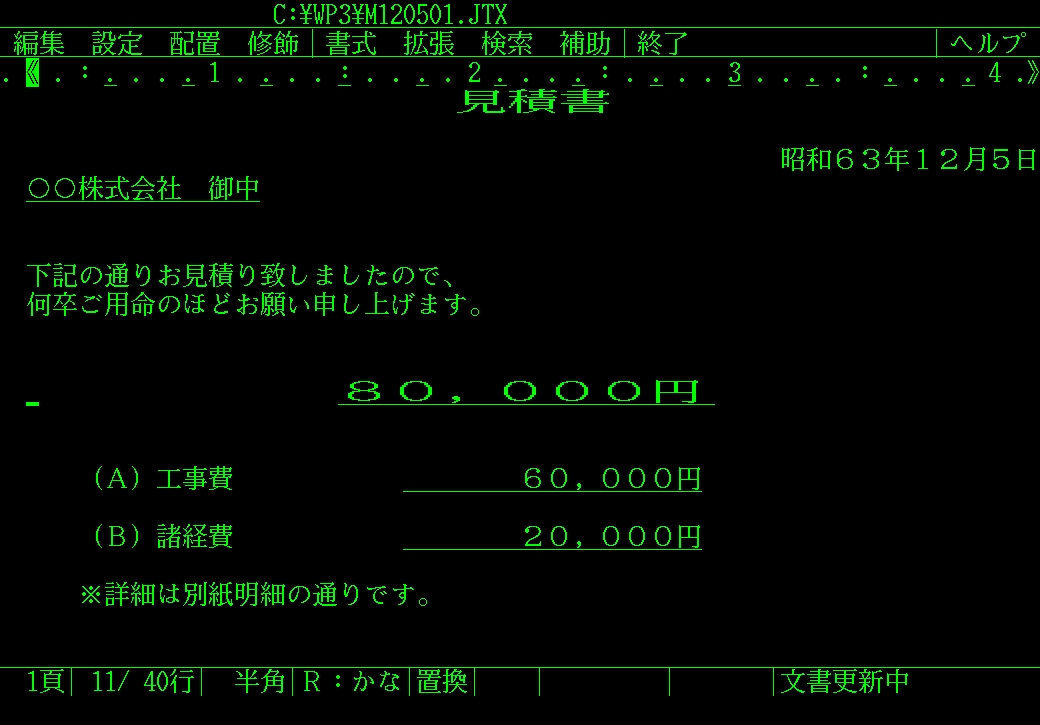
DOS Bunsho Program on PS/55

The 5550 was originally planned as a terminal with a combination of word processing and personal computing targeted for Japanese computer market. To display 24 dots Mincho kanji typeface which was also used in many Japanese word processing machines, the 5550 had high display resolution such as a 1024×768 pixel graphic screen. The first model of 5550 was designed to read a display font from an external storage for multilingual support, including Chinese and Korean languages.

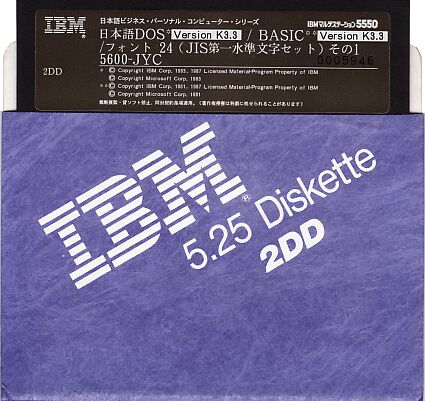
Diskette of Japanese DOS K3.3

The 5550 fulfills three roles, via the following components:

- Japanese Business Personal Computer: Japanese DOS (日本語DOS, Nihongo DOS) .
- Japanese word processor: Writing Program (文書プログラム, Bunsho Program).
- Japanese online terminal: 3270 Kanji Emulation (3270漢字エミュレーション) and 5250 Kanji Emulation (5250漢字エミュレーション).

The original Bunsho Program and emulators booted from a floppy disk without Nihongo DOS. They used a proprietary disk format which couldn't be read from Nihongo DOS, so users had to replace floppy disks or set the boot partition to switch between two programs. Also, they had to use a conversion program to exchange data. Later, they were ported for Nihongo DOS, and functions were gradually implemented. 3270 Kanji Emulation, 5250 Kanji Emulation and Bunsho Program were superseded by Nihongo 3270 PC in October 1983, Nihongo 5250 PC in September 1984 and DOS Bunsho Program in May 1986.

The first generation of IBM 5550 has up to three 5¼ inch '2DD' (720 KB) floppy drives because the Bunsho Program uses three floppy disks; program disk, font disk, and user data disk. Later models contain a font ROM card as other 1980's Japanese personal computers did.

== Development ==
Yu Kawara (川原 裕) of IBM Fujisawa Development Laboratory planned the terminal with a combination of word processor and personal computer, called the Multi-functional Workstation, and he proposed it at the headquarter in March 1981. The development team was founded as an Independent Business Unit (IBU).

The team set goals for IBM 5550 that the machine was usable for both word processing and personal computing on the same architecture at least 3-5 years. They tried to build the 5550 from the IBM Displaywriter System 6580, the English word processor developed in Austin office in 1980, and the IBM Personal Computer developed in Boca Raton office, but it was difficult to combine different types of machines.

Considering price–performance ratio and continuity of an architecture, the team examined not only Intel's but also other manufacturer's processors. The IBM PC used an Intel 8088, but the 5550 employed an Intel 8086 because bus speed largely influenced for performance of the machine which had high display resolution.

To gain an advantage over competitors in Japanese word processing, 24 pixel font models render characters in a box of 26×29 pixels, and the total display resolution is 1066×725 pixels calculated with box width by 41×25 text. 16 pixel font models render characters in a box of 18×21 pixels, and the total display resolution is 738×525 pixels. The 5550 had one more column than 40 columns of usual Japanese computers, which enabled line breaking.

For personal computing, Nihongo DOS K2.00 had been developed by Microsoft. It was the second Japanese localization of MS-DOS 2.0 followed to Toshiba's PASOPIA 16. Nihongo DOS bundled the Microsoft BASIC interpreter which designed for the 5550. Programming languages and the Japanese version of Multiplan were also provided.

The team didn't consider the machine was used for online communication, but they realized its importance during the development. They decided to add a role of a terminal in January 1982. This change extended its development term. In May 1982 Business Show (one of computer industry exhibitions in Japan), IBM Japan only displayed the IBM PC as a reference material. They unveiled the development of 5550 in fall 1982.

IBM Japan didn't have a factory for mass production of personal computers, so the production of 5550 was outsourced to some companies. System units, hard disks, and monitors were manufactured by Matsushita Electric Industrial, printers by Oki Electric Industry, and keyboards by Alps Electric.

== Models ==
- 5551-A/B/C/D/E/G/H/J/K/M/P (Basic models, placed beside the display. Later became a smaller size like 5540)
- 5541-B/E/J/K/M/P (Smaller size models, on which the display can be placed. Later made even smaller)
- 5561-G/H/J/K/M/P (Larger size models, all models employ Intel 80286)
- 5530-G/H (Stand-alone models, without the communications adapter. Used 3½ inch floppy disk)
- 5535-M (Laptop, using 3½ inch floppy disk)

== Competition ==
In Japan, Multistation 5550 competed against:

- Fujitsu FACOM 9450 and FMR series
- NEC PC-9801 series and N5200/5300 series

== Reception ==
BYTE in 1983 speculated that "we may soon see a similar machine here in America". Describing the 5550 as "a true workstation", the magazine envisioned the computer as filling the "considerable gulf above the PC", and a rival to the IBM System/36 minicomputer. It praised the 5550's "unprecedented" combination of kanji support with high-end word-processing capability, and reported that in Japan an ecosystem of vendors providing products for the computer was forming. The magazine concluded that "if the American PC is any precedent, the market should soon be filled with 5550 software".

The 5550 was primarily sold for large enterprises who used IBM's mainframe computer. Meiji Life who used the IBM 3081 mainframe decided to purchase about 500 units of the 5550 in 1983. A manager of its System Development section said, "IBM supports us to satisfy our demand for the communication software. We are planning to replace all of our IBM terminals. A new personal computer must respond for the host computer as fast as a terminal, and it must have various communication softwares."

In Japan, the 5550 had annual sales of 70,000 units in 1985, and the Nikkei Personal Computing magazine reported in 1986 that the 5550 had the largest personal computer share of 30% in the corporate sector.

== Timeline ==
Timeline of the IBM Personal Computer

Asterisk (*) denotes a model released in Japan only

== See also ==
- IBM PC, IBM PC/AT and IBM PS/2
- IBM JX, AX architecture and DOS/V
- List of IBM products

Preceded by IBM Personal Computer	IBM 5550; 1983 - 1987	Succeeded by IBM JX
Preceded by IBM Personal Computer	IBM 5550; 1983 - 1987	Succeeded by IBM PS/55
