= IBM JX =

IBM PC model released in 1984

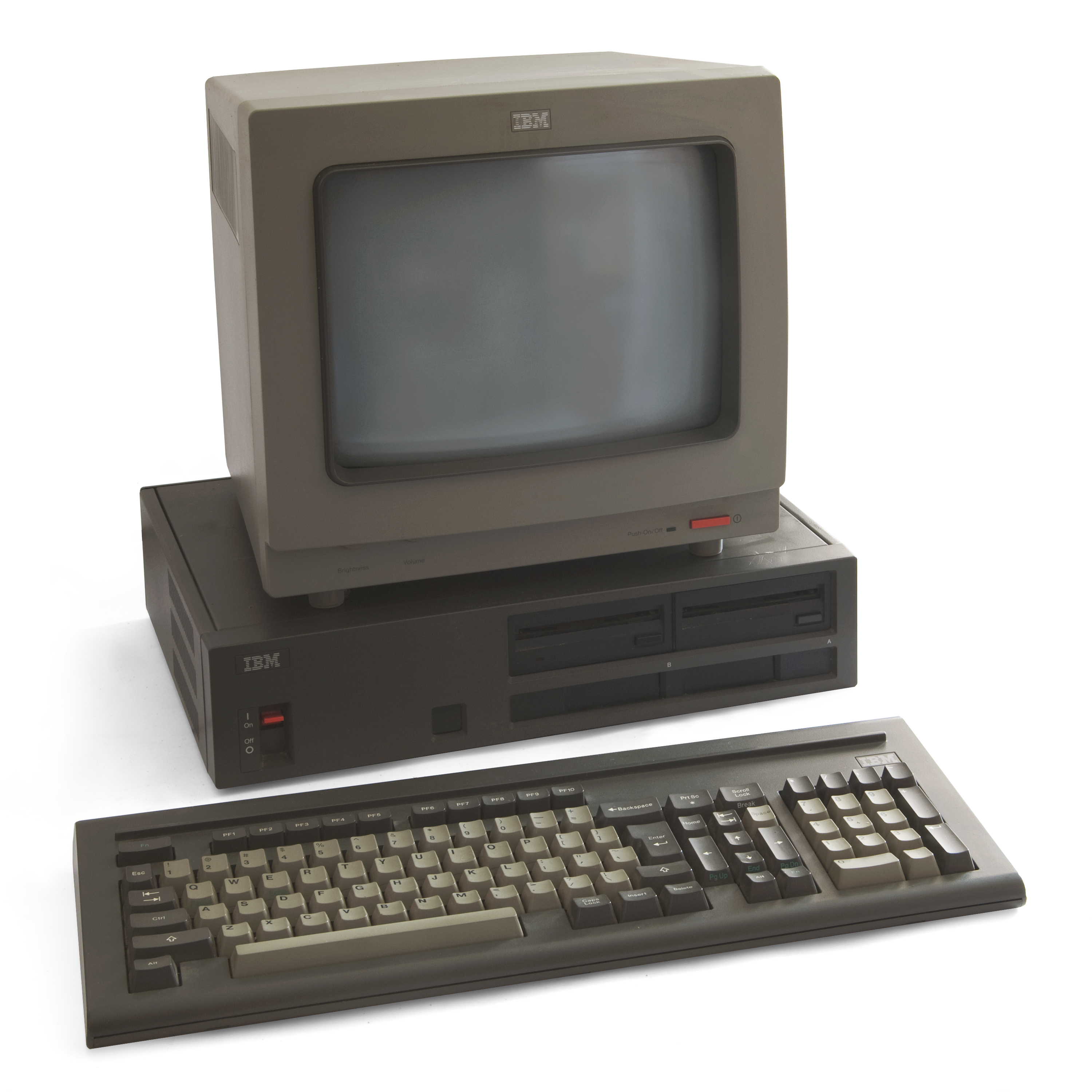
- IBM JX Personal Computer
- Also known as: JXPC, IBM 5511
- Developer: IBM Japan
- Manufacturer: Matsushita Electric Industrial
- Released: October 29, 1984; 42 years ago
- Discontinued: 1987
- Units shipped: 40,000
- Media: Cartridge, 3.5 inch floppy disks, Cassette tape
- Operating system: PC DOS 2.1, Microsoft Disk BASIC, Advanced BASIC
- CPU: Intel 8088 @ 4.77 MHz
- Display: 160 × 200 and 320 × 200 at 16 colors, 640 × 200 at 4 colors
- Sound: Texas Instruments SN76489, PC speaker
- Predecessor: IBM 5550
- Successor: IBM Personal System/55
- Made in: Japan

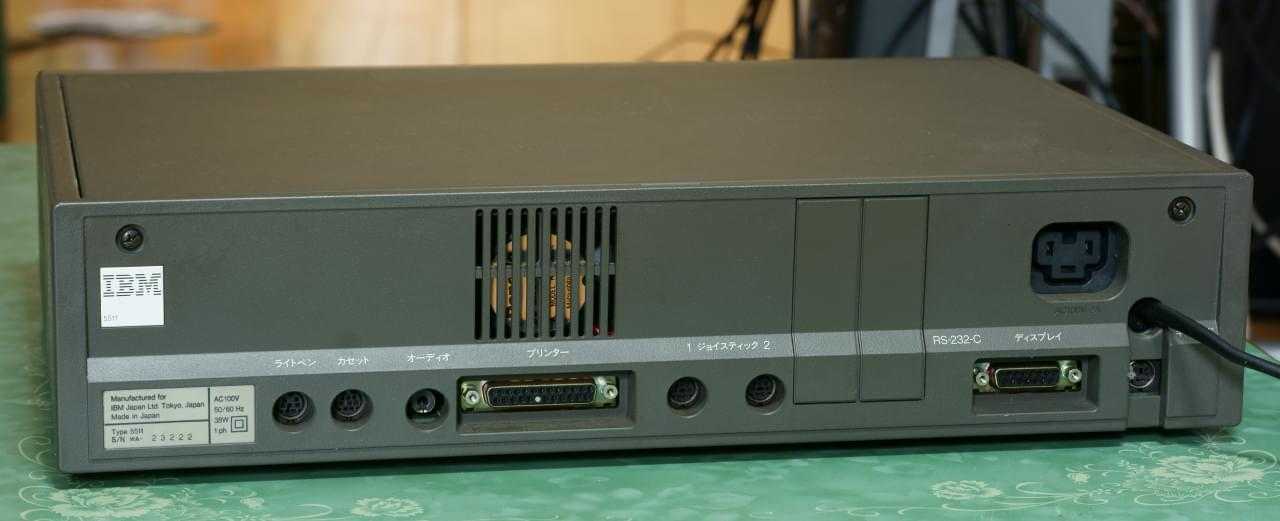
IBM JX rear view

The IBM JX (also mentioned as JXPC or IBM 5511) was a personal computer released in 1984 into the Japanese, Australian and New Zealand markets. Designed in Japan, it was based on the technology of the IBM PCjr. It was targeted in the Australasian market towards the public education sector rather than at consumers, and was sold in three levels: JX (64 KiB), JX2 (128 KiB) and JX3 (256 KiB). Upgrades were available to both 384 KiB and 512 KiB. The JX was the first IBM PC to use 3.5" floppy drives.

IBM Japan expected to sell 200,000 units of JX, but only 40,000 units were produced. The JX was discontinued in 1987, and IBM Japan gave 15,000 units of JX to its employees in honor of the company's 50th anniversary.

== General ==
The IBM JX's main difference from the PCjr was a professional keyboard (rather than the PCjr's disparaged chiclet keyboard), dual 3.5" floppy drives, as well as options for a 5.25" floppy drive and a hard drive, both of which sat atop the main unit. The JX did not support PCjr-like "sidecar" add-ons for hardware expansion. In common with the PCjr, however, it had no DMA controller. It had the same graphic capabilities as the PCjr offering 320×200 with 16 colors and 640×200 with 4 colors besides the standard CGA modes, and the PCjr's 4-channel sound. Support for these two features was utilised by only a few software developers, Sierra On-line being the most well-known.

== Configuration ==
It had several innovative features:

- Single or twin 3.5" 720 KB (initially only 360 KB) diskette drives
- Wireless infra-red keyboard
- 16-color video output
- Stackable expansion
- Joystick ports
- Cartridge slots

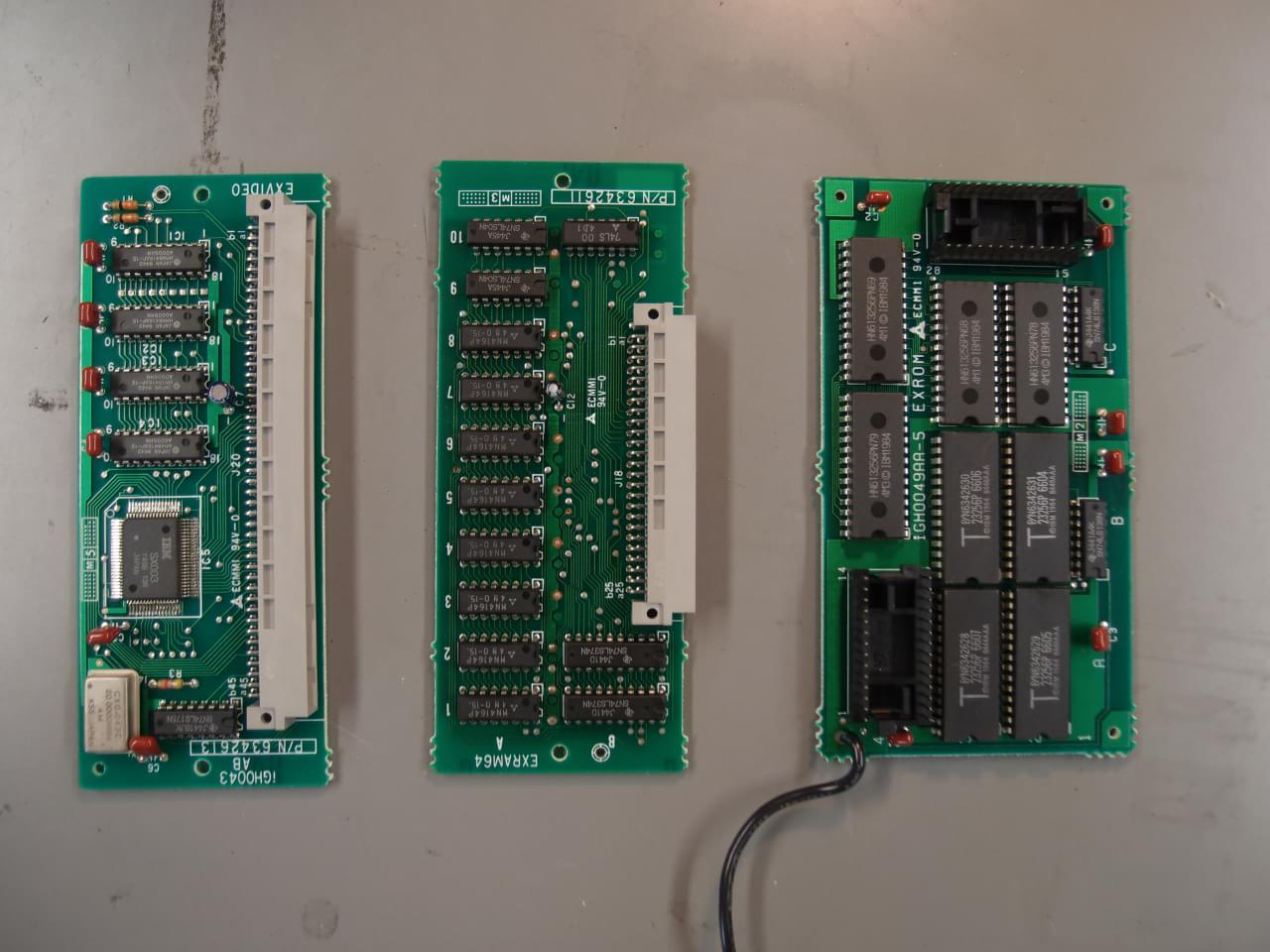
IBM JX expansion boards

In Japan, both white and dark gray units were available, but elsewhere all IBM JXs were dark gray—very unusual in the days of the standard color of IBM "beige boxes". All models sold in Japan have a Japanese font stored on 128 KB of ROM, but the basic system only has the capability to display 40 × 11 Japanese text. The Extended Display Cartridge provides 40 × 25 Japanese text mode, and its display resolution is 720 × 512 pixels like a 16-pixel font model of the IBM 5550. This cartridge contains a BASIC interpreter compatible with 5550's.

However, one disadvantage it shared with the PCjr was that it could not use the standard ISA bus cards of the IBM PC.

The system operated PC DOS 2.11 as well as Microsoft Disk BASIC and Microsoft Advanced BASIC. Like the PC, if the system was left to boot without inserting a diskette into one of the drives the Microsoft Cassette BASIC interpreter would be loaded, which was compatible with IBM PCjr BASIC, including Cartridge BASIC. PC DOS 2.11 could only use half of the tracks of a 3.5-inch drive, however, since it didn't really understand what a 3.5-inch drive even was. The PCjx's BIOS could only address the first 40 tracks, like a 5.25-inch drive.

The PCjx later had a BIOS upgrade chip, sold together with PC DOS 3.21, which could use the full 720 KB capacity of the diskette drives. Some popular options for the PCjx were a 5.25" 360 KB capacity diskette drive, a 10 MB external hard disk (both of these as stackable units the same size as the JX itself) and a joystick. IBM never released a 3270 emulation adapter for the PCjx, in order to steer enterprise customers to more-expensive IBM PCs and XTs.

== Reception ==
BYTE in 1985 called the JX "a Japanese product for the Japanese; its price and capabilities reflect its target market". The magazine stated that its compatibility with PCjr peripherals rather than the PC's, and joystick ports and audio, "suggests that IBM Japan is hedging its bets by pursuing a share of the easily saturated video-game sector". BYTE concluded that "the JX will enjoy, at best, a modest and short-lived success—it's too little, too late" against more-sophisticated rival computers.

IBM Japan advertised the JX as a home computer, but its sales didn't grow even in 1986. According to the Nikkei Personal Computing journal, a distributor revealed the number of units sold was "around 2,000 units in Japan alone", and an industry insider expected "Sales to retail stores, overseas stores, IBM's employees, their family, and direct sales to large customers. Including all of these, about 10,000 units". One computer store declared that customers wouldn't buy it even at one quarter list price. The Japanese home computer market was much smaller than its video game console market compared with Western countries, yet NEC sold 75,000 units of PC-88 in the four months since November 1985.

Many people pointed out the matter was adopting the 8088 processor. In Japan, the mainstream of Intel microprocessors was moving from the 8086 to the 80286, and computer enthusiasts considered the 8088 as a branch of them. Also, a novice personal computer user generally chose his new machine with the advice of his closest acquaintance familiar with personal computers. Such advices spread, and damaged buyer's reputations for the JX. A developer of the JX insisted it was designed to run western PCjr softwares without modification, but few Japanese users wanted them. In another point, there were not enough software titles for the JX. An independent software company said IBM Japan was uncooperative for developing JX software. Another company complained "Some software for the JX have a brand called IBM, don't they? Even if another company creates better software, it can never beat them". The JX was the first IBM PC compatible computer sold by IBM Japan, but they started selling the PC/XT and PC/AT in November 1985.

The IBM 5550 sold well for Japanese companies who used IBM's mainframe computer. The JX providing the Japanese text mode and word processor had the potential to expand into the small-business sector. However, in February 1985, IBM Japan released the IBM 5540 as the entry-level line of the IBM 5550. The IBM 5540 offered a fully compatibility with the 5550 at the price between the 5550 and JX. A sales manager of IBM Japan expected it expanded their lineup of computers, but the announcement confused IBM users. A businessman who used the 5550 in his office and the JX at his home complained "If I knew the 5540 would release four months later, I wouldn't have purchased the JX". Both JX and 5540 took a long time to develop. The product manager explained that they spent 70% of their efforts on compatibility with older machines every time they developed new machines. The Nikkei Personal Computing journal pointed out both were developed at the same time at the Fujisawa Development Laboratory, and suspected that IBM Japan was imposed to release the JX first by its parent company, IBM.

Masahiko Hatori(羽鳥 正彦), who developed the BIOS and DOS for the JX, recalled the development staff were anxious that it would be too late to compete with other Japanese machines although the management thought it went well whatever IBM made. They were using NEC and other companies' computers at their home. He also revealed the reason why the JX used the 8088 processor was both the development and sales teams thought a consumer-class JX mustn't surpass a business-class 5550. The JX was dedicated to be inexpensive for personal use, but it didn't suit consumers who preferred the fast response time for gaming.

IBM Japan didn't disclose its unit sales, but the Nikkei Computer journal reported in 1987 that only 40,000 units were produced according to the insider. The company planned a 100% PC/AT compatible machine "JX II" which could handle Japanese text like the JX did, but was cancelled in 1986. They never developed a consumer product until they entered the education sector with the PS/55Z in 1988.

== Timeline ==
Timeline of the IBM Personal Computer

Asterisk (*) denotes a model released in Japan only

Preceded by IBM PCjr	IBM JX; 1984 - 1987	Succeeded by IBM PS/55
Preceded by IBM 5550	IBM JX; 1984 - 1987	Succeeded by IBM PS/55
