= Fujitsu ARROWS A 201F =

Smartphone

ARROWS A SoftBank 201F
- Brand: SoftBank Mobile
- Manufacturer: Fujitsu Mobile Communications
- Type: Smartphone
- Series: SoftBank Smartphone
- First released: February 16, 2013; 13 years ago
- Predecessor: SoftBank 101F
- Compatible networks: SoftBank 3G (W-CDMA, 900 MHz band); GSM; SoftBank 4G (AXGP); EDGE
- Form factor: Slate
- Colors: Ocean Blue; Sparkling Pink; Black; White
- Dimensions: 129 mm (5.1 in) H 65 mm (2.6 in) W 10.8 mm (0.43 in) D
- Weight: 151 g (5.3 oz)
- Operating system: Android 4.1
- System-on-chip: Qualcomm Snapdragon S4 Pro APQ8064
- CPU: 1.5 GHz quad-core
- Memory: 2 GB RAM
- Storage: 32 GB (approx. 28 GB available to user)
- Removable storage: microSD (up to 2 GB) microSDHC (up to 32 GB) microSDXC (up to 64 GB)
- Battery: 2420 mAh
- Rear camera: 13.1 MP back-illuminated CMOS (Exmor R for mobile), f/2.4, Full HD video recording
- Front camera: 1.2 MP CMOS
- Display: 4.7-inch Super Clear Panel (TFT LCD); 1280 × 720 pixels (HD), approx. 16.77 million colors
- Water resistance: Waterproof / Dustproof

The ARROWS A 201F is a 3.9G SoftBank 4G smartphone manufactured by Fujitsu Mobile Communications for SoftBank Mobile. Part of the SoftBank Smartphone line, it runs on the Android 4.1 operating system.

It serves as the successor to the SoftBank 101F, introducing a quad-core processor to the series. Compared to the qHD display on the 101F, the display resolution was upgraded to HD. The device supports both NFC and Osaifu-Keitai (FeliCa).

It is the first model in the ARROWS series to ship with Android 4.1 pre-installed. Additionally, it is the first device since the SoftBank 831T (including the Toshiba era) to feature the "Kūman no Heya" mascot application.

The device's marketing catchphrase was "4G compatible super-fast quad-core CPU × naturally beautiful high image quality."

== History ==
- October 9, 2012 – Announced by SoftBank Mobile.
- February 16, 2013 – Sales commenced.

== Specifications ==
=== Hardware ===
The ARROWS A 201F is powered by a 1.5 GHz quad-core Qualcomm Snapdragon S4 Pro APQ8064 processor alongside an MDM9215 modem unit. It features 2 GB of RAM, 32 GB of internal storage (with approximately 28 GB available for user data), and supports external memory via microSD cards up to 2 GB, microSDHC up to 32 GB, and microSDXC up to 64 GB.

The device features a 4.7-inch Super Clear Panel TFT LCD screen with an HD resolution of 1280 × 720 pixels displaying up to 16.77 million colors. It is powered by a 2,420 mAh battery, requiring approximately 200 minutes to fully charge. Continuous talk time is rated at approximately 640 minutes on 3G and 520 minutes on GSM, while standby time is rated at approximately 300 hours on AXGP, 460 hours on 3G, and 450 hours on GSM.

For connectivity, the phone supports SoftBank 3G (W-CDMA, 900 MHz "Platinum Band"), GSM, SoftBank 4G (AXGP with download speeds up to 76 Mbit/s and upload speeds up to 10 Mbit/s), EDGE, Wi-Fi 802.11a/b/g/n, Bluetooth 4.0, IrSimple infrared communication, and Wi-Fi tethering. External connections include a microUSB port (shared host and MHL), a 3.5 mm headphone jack, and power terminals for a desktop cradle.

The main rear camera features a 13.1-megapixel back-illuminated CMOS (Exmor R for mobile) with an aperture of f/2.4, capable of Full HD video recording. The front-facing camera uses a 1.2-megapixel CMOS sensor. Additional built-in features include 1seg TV reception (with approximately 7 hours of continuous viewing), Osaifu-Keitai/NFC, GPS, Emergency Alert Mail, and IPX5/IPX8 waterproof and dustproof protection.

=== Software ===
The smartphone runs Android 4.1 as its operating system. Text input is handled by ATOK (NX!Input) with handwriting recognition support. Media playback supports digital audio formats including AAC and WMA.

== Known issues ==
On March 21, 2013, a software update was released to fix a bug where earphones were incorrectly detected, causing audio output to fail.

Distribution of this update was discontinued on March 31, 2017, preventing users from performing over-the-air updates directly on the device. Users seeking to update their device after April 1, 2017, must bring the handset to a SoftBank retail location to have the update applied at a manufacturer service center free of charge (though separate fees may apply if physical repairs are required).
