= Ichitaro (word processor) =

Japanese word processor

- Developer: JustSystems
- Stable release: Ichitaro 2025 (35.0) / 7 February 2025
- Operating system: Windows
- Type: Word processor
- License: Proprietary
- Website: www.ichitaro.com

Ichitaro (一太郎, ichitarō) is a Japanese word processor produced by JustSystems, a Japanese software company. Ichitaro occupies the second share in Japanese word-processing software, behind Microsoft Word. It is one of the main products of the company. Its proprietary file extension is ".JTD". ATOK, an IME developed by JustSystems, is bundled with Ichitaro.

In the MS-DOS era, Ichitaro had a considerable market share along with other rivals. As Windows became dominant, the market was largely taken over by Microsoft Word.

== Origin of name ==
"Taro (太郎)" was named by Kazunori Ukigawa (浮川 和宣), a founder of JustSystems. When he worked part-time as a tutor, one of his learners' names was Taro. He died of sickness when Kazunori worked at the company. Taro is also a common Japanese given name used for the eldest son. Sanyo Electric already had a trademark right of the name, so JustSystems added a prefix "Ichi (一)" as they hoped the software won the best.

== History ==
=== Beginnings ===
JustSystems was founded in July 1979 by Hatsuko (初子) and Kazunori Ukigawa, and was incorporated in June 1981. Kazunori worked at a subsidiary company of Toshiba, and he was interested in Japanese-language computing. Toshiba released JW-10 in February 1979, the first word processor for the Japanese language, but it sold less than their business computers. He founded the company as a dealer of business computers, and they started selling Japanese language software. After the release of PC-8801, they developed an invoicing software for it, which printed out estimations and invoices in Japanese. They demonstrated it at trade fairs, and received a positive response.

When they contacted to ASCII Microsoft about a run-time license fee of the BASIC compiler used for their farm management software, ASCII had known JustSystem's Japanese software, so they asked JustSystems to develop a Japanese word processor software for PC-100. It was released as JS-WORD in 1983. It was followed by JS-WORD 2.0 ported for PC-9801. Both were published by ASCII under their name. JS-WORD featured mouse support and a graphical icon-based interface, but it resulted in poor performance. The jX-WORD for the IBM JX was released and in 1985, jX-WORD Taro was released for PC-9801. jX-WORD Taro was priced at ¥58,000, which was the middle price among Japanese word processor software, and sold 9,700 copies.

=== Domination in Japan PC market ===
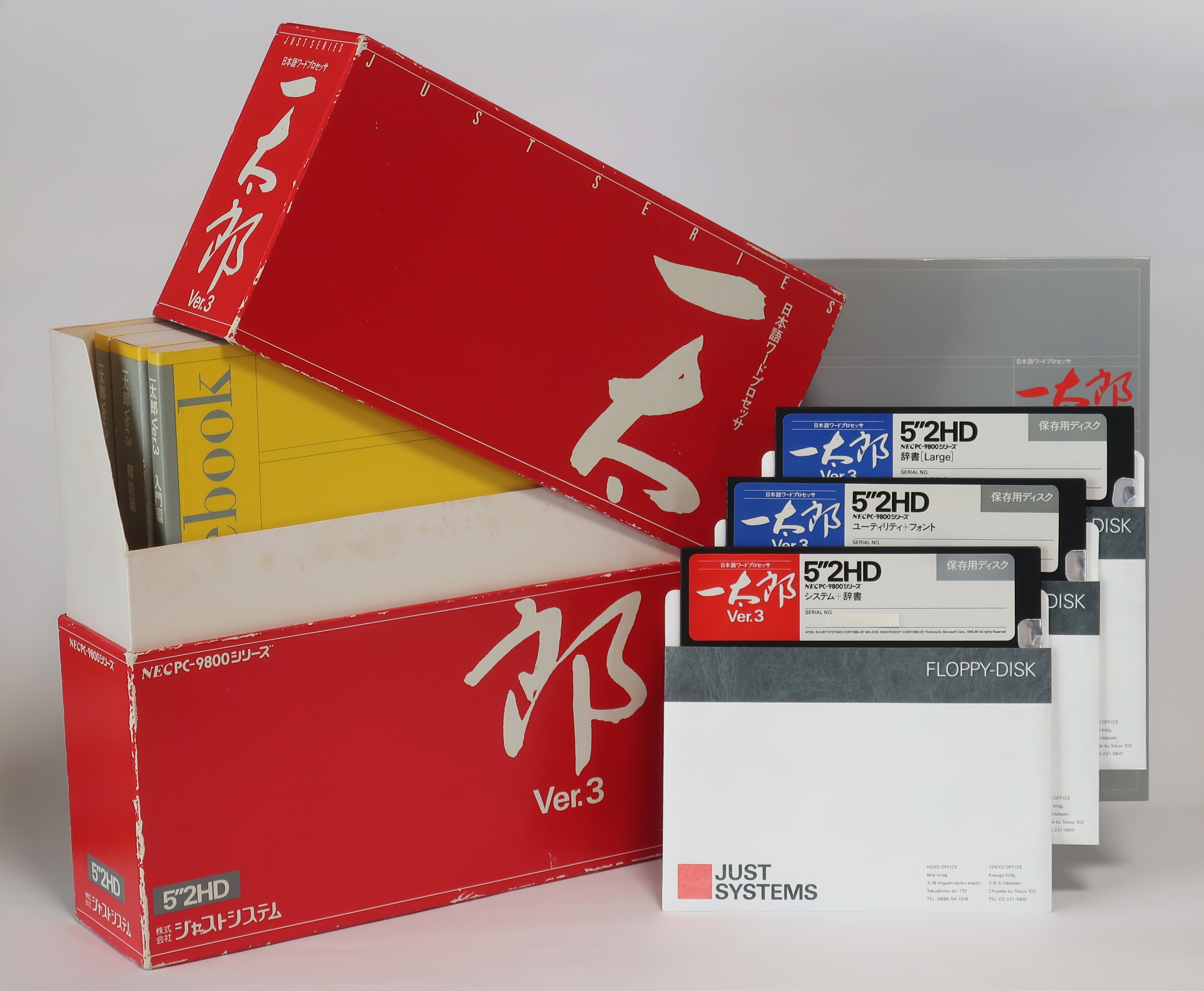
Ichitaro Ver.3 for PC-98

The same year, Ichitaro was released as its definite successor. Ichitaro's system disk contained ATOK 4 and a runtime version of MS-DOS 2.11. It allowed users to use other MS-DOS applications with Japanese language support. The biggest competitor, Matsu (松), was released in 1983 by Kanri Kōgaku Kenkyūjo (管理工学研究所). It gained speed from being written in assembly language and natively ran on PC-9801, but Matsu's Japanese input method couldn't be used for other applications. Ichitaro had plenty of typesettings options, but Matsu did not. Also, Matsu was priced at ¥128,000 before Ichitaro came out.

The first version of Ichitaro has shipped 29,000 copies. Ichitaro Ver.2 has shipped 80,000 copies. Ichitaro Ver.3 was the first version ported for other Japanese DOS platforms. It has shipped more than 300,000 copies until 1991. Total shipments of Ichitaro reached one million in November 1991. Contrary to the Japanese personal computer market expanding into beginners, Matsu oriented for power users, so Ichitaro overtook it.

Ichitaro Ver.4 was released in April 1989. It had a proprietary operating environment called Just Window (ジャストウィンドウ), like Lotus Symphony. Three minor versions were released because it was buggy. The stable version was 4.3 released in December 1989. ATOK 7 was bundled with Ichitaro 4, and was available as a standalone product in 1992.

=== Arrival of Microsoft Word ===
Microsoft released the first Japanese version of Microsoft Word for Windows in 1991. Four years passed before Ichitaro 5 was released for Japanese DOS platforms in April 1993. The next month, Microsoft released the Japanese Windows 3.1 and the first Japanese version of Microsoft Office, which included Word 5.0 and Excel 4.0. Its successors shipped 200,000 copies per month in late 1994. JustSystems barely completed a Windows adaptation of Ichitaro in December 1993, but Microsoft took over the market dominated by Ichitaro and Lotus 1-2-3.

Which do you use, Ichitaro or Microsoft Word, 1997
Microsoft Word	64%
Ichitaro	35%
The result of questionnaires, Impress PC Watch

As of 1997, a Japanese media website reported that 64% of readers using Microsoft Word, and the main reason was that they used it in offices and schools. The rest of 35% were using Ichitaro, and the main reason was that the IME of ATOK was convenient.

In 1998, the Japan Fair Trade Commission informed Microsoft of an unfair trade that they forced personal computer manufacturers to bundle with Excel and Word against the request of a bundle with Excel and Ichitaro.

Ichitaro Ver.5 was ported to the Macintosh and to OS/2. In May 2003, the release of a Linux version was announced. Compact versions, "Ichitaro dash" and "Ichitaro lite" are produced for laptop PCs. As office suite, "Just home" is also available. "Ichitaro smile" is targeted at elementary school students and "Ichitaro jump" at middle and high school students.

On 1 February 2005, sales and production of the software were frozen pending an appeal by the company against a ruling of the Tokyo District Court which states that there is a breach of a patent owned by Matsushita Electric Industrial Co., Ltd. However, on 30 September 2005, Intellectual Property High Court of Japan, which was newly formed in April 2005, has granted JustSystems’ appeal. Because this judgement became a final decision in October 2005, the original decision sentenced by the Tokyo District Court was overturned.

In 2009, JustSystems became a subsidiary company of Keyence. In the 2010s, they focus on correspondence education and enterprise software although Ichitaro and ATOK continue to be developed.

== Versions ==
Version	Release date	Notes
JS-WORD	October 1983	For PC-100, published by ASCII under their name
JS-WORD 2.0	May 1984	For PC-9800 series, published by ASCII
jX-WORD	December 1984	For IBM JX series
jX-WORD Taro	February 1985	For PC-9800 series
1	28 August 1985	Allow the use of ATOK from other applications
2	May 1986	
3	June 1987	No disk copy protection from this version
4	April 1989	Three minor versions exist, 4.1, 4.2, and 4.3
5	April 1993	Mac version released in July 1995
6	January 1995	Version 6.3 (August 1995) included internet connectivity
7	September 1996	Windows 95. Dropped support for Windows 3.1
8	February 1997	
9	September 1998	All versions from here use .jtd extension
10	September 1999	
11	February 2001	
12	February 2002	Dropped support for Windows 95
13	February 2003	
14	February 2004	Ichitaro 2004
15	February 2005	Ichitaro 2005
16	February 2006	Ichitaro 2006
17	9 February 2007	Ichitaro 2007. Dropped support for Windows 98 and Me
18	8 February 2008	Ichitaro 2008
19	6 February 2009	Ichitaro 2009. Windows 7
20	5 February 2010	Ichitaro 2010. Dropped support for Windows 2000
21	10 February 2011	Ichitaro 2011 Sō (創)
22	10 February 2012	Ichitaro 2012 Shō (承)
23	8 February 2013	Ichitaro 2013 Gen (玄). DRM activation implemented
24	7 February 2014	Ichitaro 2014 Tetsu (徹)
25	6 February 2015	Ichitaro 2015. Dropped support for Windows XP
26	5 February 2016	Ichitaro 2016
27	3 February 2017	Ichitaro 2017. Dropped support for Windows Vista
28	9 February 2018	Ichitaro 2018
29	8 February 2019	Ichitaro 2019
30	7 February 2020	Ichitaro 2020. Dropped support for Windows 7
31	5 February 2021	Ichitaro 2021
32	10 February 2022	Ichitaro 2022
33	10 February 2023	Ichitaro 2023. Dropped support for Windows 7 and 8.1
34	9 February 2024	Ichitaro 2024
35	7 February 2025	Ichitaro 2025

== Security ==
In 2013, Symantec revealed that Ichitaro had the potential to be targeted by trojan horse programs. A gang of Chinese hackers was widely blamed for the incident.

== See also ==
- ATOK
- Office Open XML software
- OpenDocument software
