= PC-98 =

Series of PCs by NEC, sold primarily in Japan

PC-9800 series

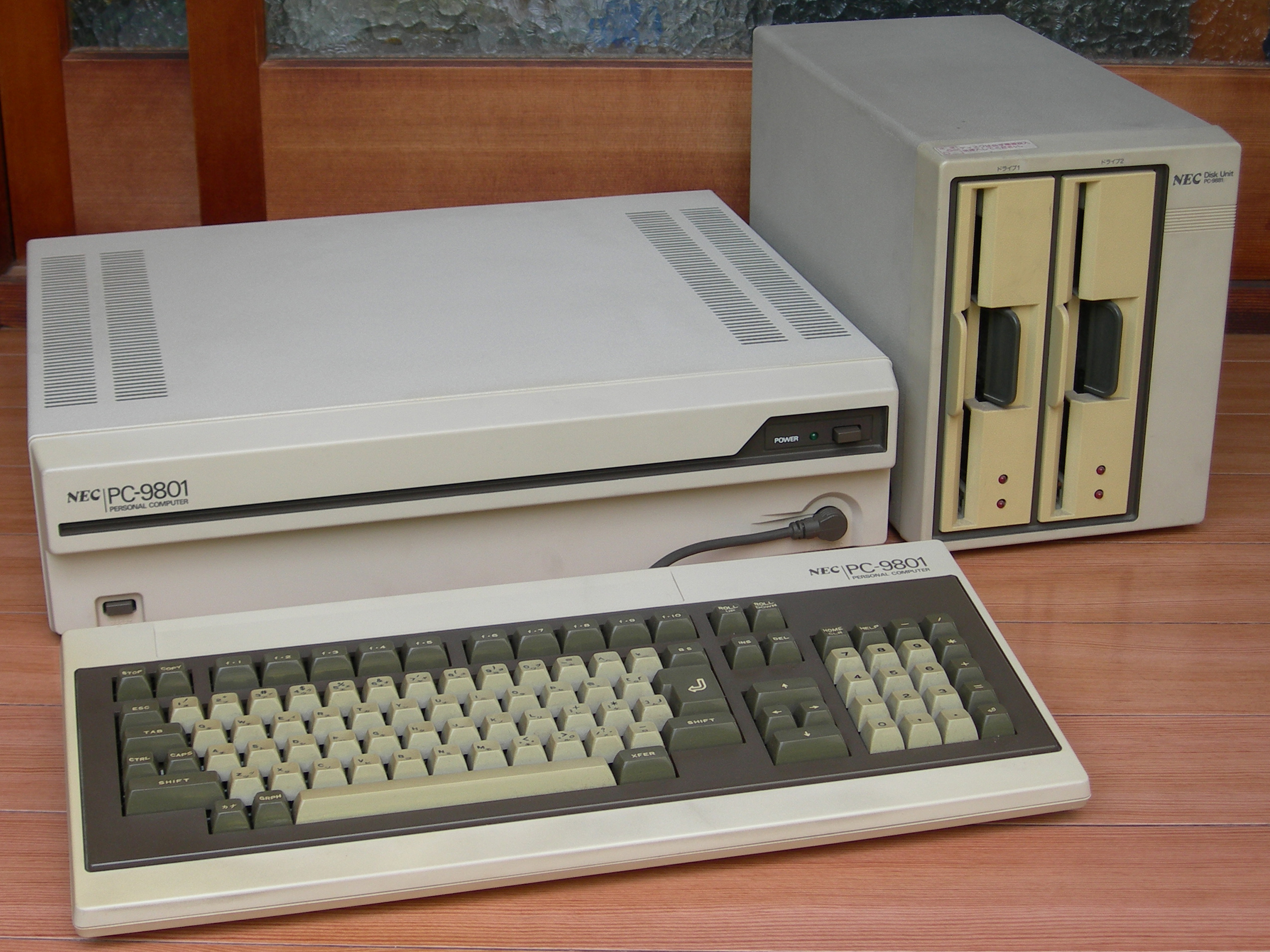
- PC-9801 with 8-inch floppy drives
- Manufacturer: NEC
- Type: Personal computers
- Released: October 1982; 44 years ago
- Discontinued: September 30, 2003; 23 years ago
- Units shipped: 18.3 million
- Operating system: N88-BASIC(86), CP/M-86, MS-DOS, Microsoft Windows, OS/2, PC-UX, NetWare
- CPU: Intel 8086, 80286, i386, i486, NEC V30, i586
- Graphics: Two NEC μPD7220 display controllers
- Predecessor: PC-8800 series
- Language: Japanese language

The PC-9800 series (Note: Japanese: PC-9800シリーズ, Hepburn: Pī Shī Kyūsen Happyaku Shirīzu), commonly shortened to PC-98 or simply 98 (キューハチ, Kyū-hachi), is a lineup of Japanese 16-bit and 32-bit personal computers manufactured by NEC from 1982 to 2003. While based on standard x86-16 and x86-32 processors, it uses an in-house architecture making it incompatible with IBM clones; some PC-98 computers used NEC's own V30 processor. The platform established NEC's dominance in the Japanese personal computer market, and, by 1999, more than 18 million units had been sold. While NEC did not market these specific machines in the West, it sold the NEC APC series, which had similar hardware to early PC-98 models.

The PC-98 was initially released as a business-oriented personal computer which had backward compatibility with the successful PC-8800 series. The range of the series was expanded, and in the 1990s it was used in a variety of industry fields including education and hobbies. NEC succeeded in attracting third-party suppliers and a wide range of users, and the PC-98 dominated the Japanese PC market with more than 60% market share by 1991. IBM clones lacked sufficient graphics capabilities to easily handle Japan's multiple writing systems, in particular kanji with its thousands of characters. In addition, Japanese computer manufacturers marketed personal computers that were based on each proprietary architecture for the domestic market. Global PC manufacturers, with the exception of Apple, had failed to overcome the language barrier, and the Japanese PC market was isolated from the global market.

By 1990, average CPUs and graphics capabilities were sufficiently improved. The DOS/V operating system enabled IBM clones to display Japanese text by using a software font only, giving a chance for global PC manufacturers to enter the Japanese PC market. The PC-98 is a non-IBM compatible x86-based computer and is thus capable of running ported (and localized) versions of MS-DOS and Microsoft Windows. However, as Windows spread, software developers no longer had to code their software separately for each specific platform. An influx of cheaper clone computers by American vendors, and later the popularity of Windows 95 reducing the demand for PC-98 legacy applications, led to NEC abandoning compatibility with the PC-98 platform in 1997 and releasing the PC98-NX series of Wintel computers, based on the PC System Design Guide.

== History ==
=== Background ===
NEC developed mainframes since the 1950s. By 1976, the company had the 4th highest mainframe sales (10.4%) in Japan after IBM (29.6%), Fujitsu (20.1%) and Hitachi (15.8%). NEC did not have a presence in the consumer market, and its subsidiary, New Nippon Electric (later NEC Home Electronics), had limited success with consumer products. NEC's Information Processing Group, which developed mainframes and minicomputers, had not developed a personal computer because they assumed microprocessors were not suitable for computing as they suffered from a lack of performance and reliability. However, the Electronic Device Sales Division developed the microprocessor evaluation kit TK-80, which became unexpectedly popular among hobbyists. Tomio Gotō (後藤 富雄), a developer of the TK-80, observed the rise in popularity of personal computers at the 1977 West Coast Computer Faire in San Francisco. Goto and his section manager, Kazuya Watanabe (渡邊 和也), decided to develop a personal computer despite criticism from the Information Processing Group. The division only had a small distribution network of electronic parts stores, so they asked New Nippon Electric to sell the personal computers through their consumer distribution network.

The Electronic Device Sales Division launched the PC-8001 in 1979, and it dominated 40% of the Japanese personal computer market in 1981. The vice president of NEC, Atsuyoshi Ōuchi (大内 淳義), stated:

It is sure that we cannot deny contributions of Electronic Devices Group as a parent of the personal computer. However, if personal computers are considered computers, Information Processing Group should handle them in NEC. Also, if personal computers are considered home electronics, we cannot deny a proposal from New Nippon Electric.

In April 1981, NEC decided to expand their personal computer lines into three groups: New Nippon Electric, the Information Processing Group, and the Electronic Devices Group, with each specializing in a particular series. New Nippon Electric made 8-bit home computers (PC-6000 series), while the Information Processing Group made 16-bit business personal computers and the Electronic Devices Group made other personal computers such as the PC-8000, the PC-8800 and the PC-100 series.

=== Development ===
Advert of NEC personal computers in 1982. From upper left, PC-6001, PC-8001, PC-8801, N5200, and PC-9801. The headline says "New release but useful right away."

In the Information Processing Small Systems Division, Shunzō Hamada (浜田 俊三) directed the project and Noboru Ozawa (小澤 昇) did the product planning. The development team initially planned for the new personal computer to be a small version of the business computer line which originated from the 1973 NEAC System 100. Kazuya Watanabe stated that the personal computer must have Microsoft BASIC, considered compatibility of peripheral devices with previous NEC PCs, and disclosed specifications of its expansion slot. In September 1981, Hamada requested ASCII's Kazuhiko Nishi to rewrite N88-BASIC to run on the Intel 8086 processor, and Nishi replied, saying that he wanted to talk with Bill Gates. Three months later, Nishi rejected Hamada's request because Microsoft was busy with the development of GW-BASIC, and they did not want to produce more variants of Microsoft BASIC. Nishi told him, "Microsoft is rewriting a BASIC that has the same function with more structured internal code, and it will be sold as the definitive 16-bit version named GW-BASIC. We'll provide a BASIC sooner if you choose the Japanese adoption of GW BASIC." Hamada replied, "As I said, we want a BASIC that is compatible with the previous ones." They could not make an agreement.

Hamada could not decide which plan they should develop, a small business computer or a personal computer, because the possibilities of Watanabe's plan was uncertain. While they were visiting software companies to collect and research applications for the PC-8001 and PC-8801, Hamada and Watanabe discovered that the consumer market wanted a 16-bit machine compatible with both PCs. Hamada decided to adopt two plans for different markets. In April 1982, the small business personal computer became the NEC System 20 model 15, which used a proprietary 16-bit microprocessor. The machine was introduced as a new model of traditional business computers, so it was not notable.

In February 1982, the software development team started reverse engineering N88-BASIC and designing N88-BASIC(86). After the team finished in March 1982, they started development on the PC-9801 (named N-10 Project). A PC-9801 prototype was completed at the end of July 1982. The code of N88-BASIC (86) was written completely from scratch, but Nishi pointed out that the bytecode matched Microsoft's. It was unclear if the copyright law could apply to the bytecode. Nishi suggested to Hamada that NEC must have purchased the same amount of Microsoft's product as it corresponded to the license fee, and N88-BASIC(86) must show copyright notification for both Microsoft and NEC. Hamada approved it.

The team considered third-party developers to be very important for the market's expansion. They provided 50–100 prototypes and technical information for independent companies without a fee.

In 1981, the Terminal Units Division of the Information Processing Group also launched the personal computer series N5200, which was branded as the "personal terminal". It used an Intel 8086 processor and a μPD7220 display controller. Its architecture was similar to that of the PC-98, but it mostly ran the proprietary operating system PTOS. NEC introduced it as an intelligent terminal or a workstation and was distinguished within personal computer lines. For this market, Fujitsu released the FACOM 9450 in 1981, and IBM Japan released the Multistation 5550 in 1983.

=== Release and growth ===
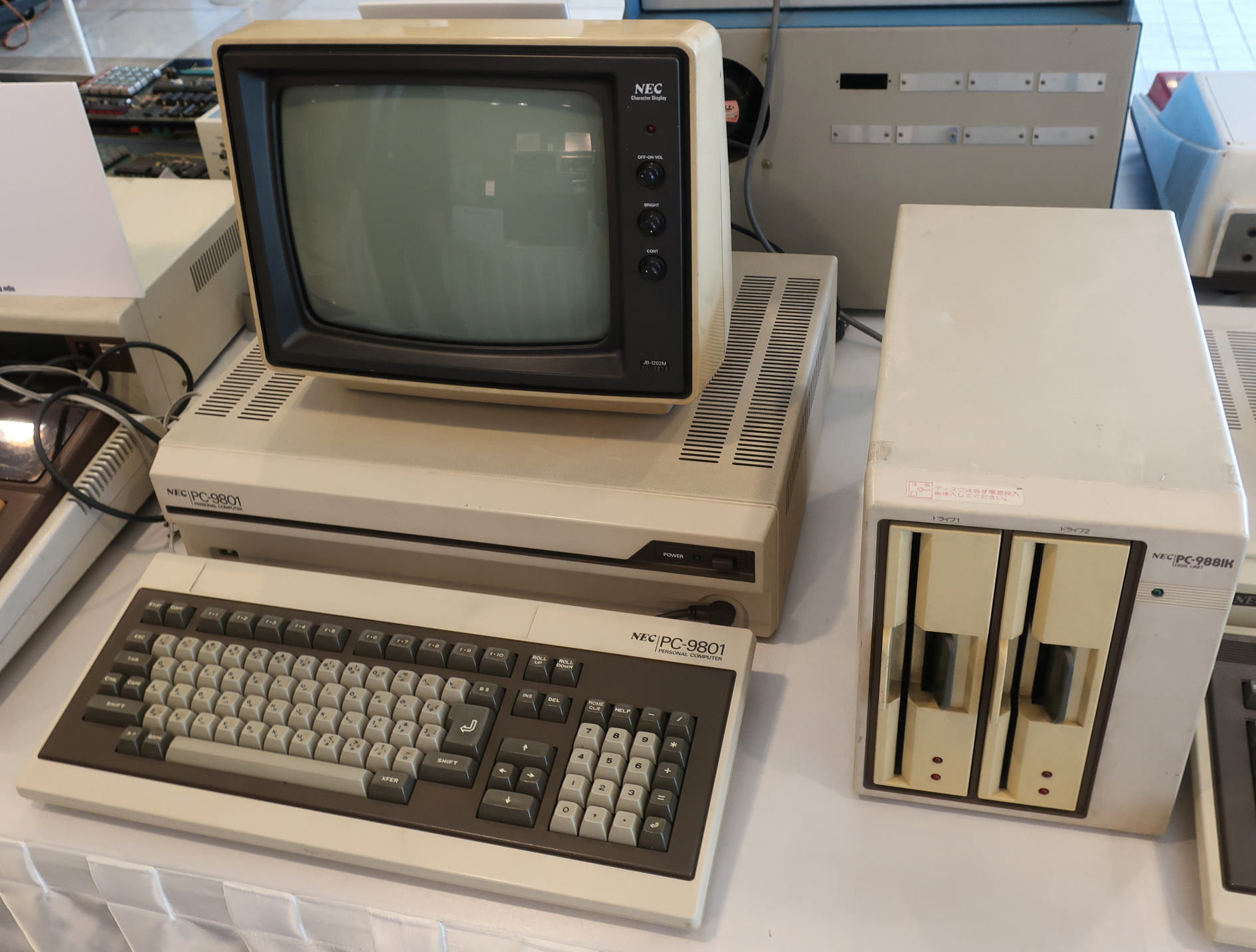
PC-9801

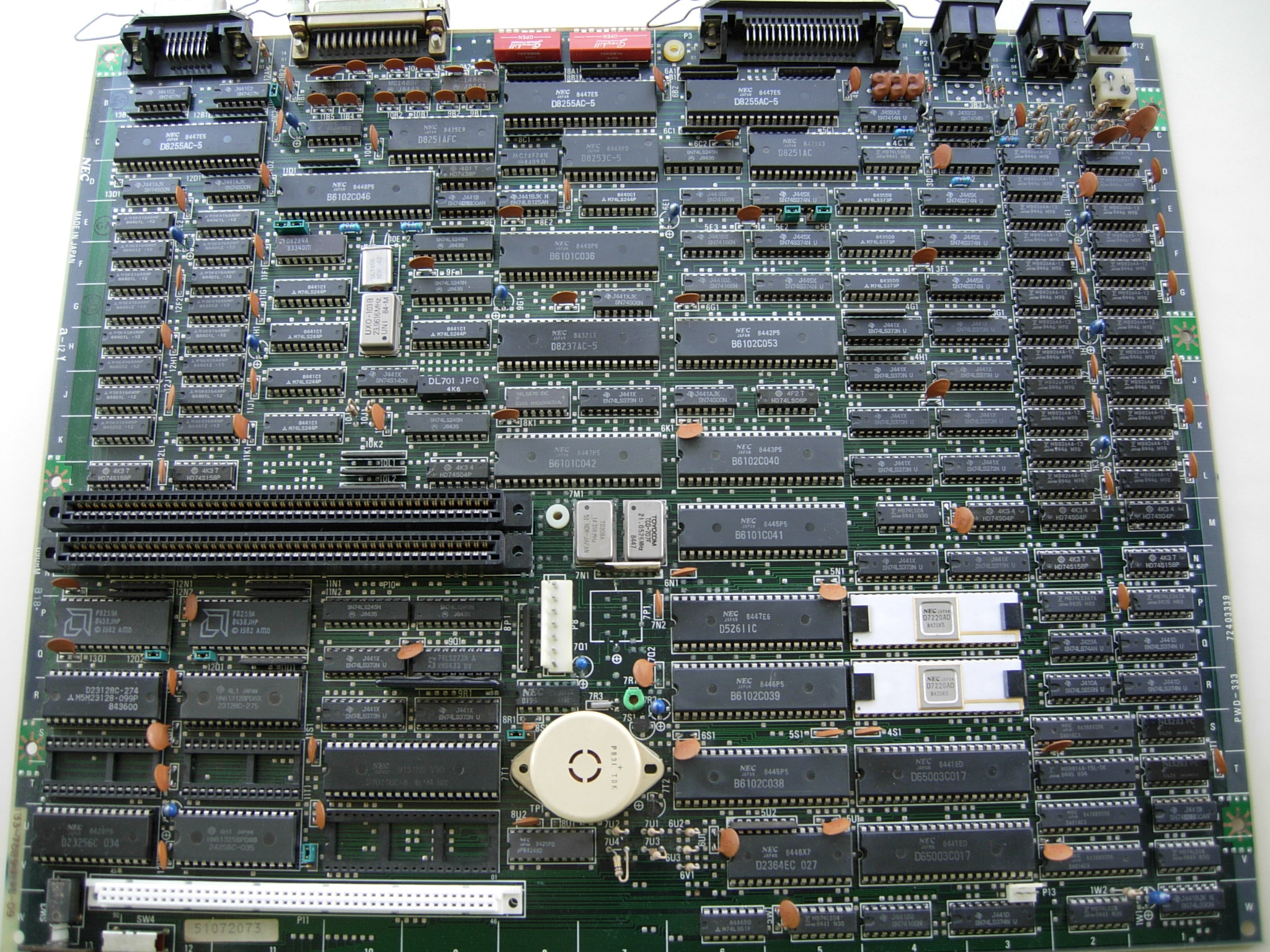
PC-9801F motherboard

The first model, the PC-9801, launched in October 1982, and employs an 8086 CPU. It runs at a clock speed of 5 MHz, with two μPD7220 display controllers (one for text, the other for video graphics), and was shipped with 128 KB of RAM that can be expanded to 640 KB. Its 8-color display has a maximum resolution of 640×400 pixels.

When the PC-9801 launched in 1982, it was initially priced at 298,000 yen (about US$1,200 in 1982 dollars). It can use PC-88 peripherals such as displays and floppy disk drives, and it can run software developed for N88-BASIC with a few modifications. For new buyers, it required either an expensive 1232 KB 8-inch floppy drive or a smaller capacity 320 KB 5¼-inch floppy drive. The basic system can display JIS X 0201 characters including numbers, English characters, and half-width kana, so most users added an optional kanji ROM board for using a Japanese word processor. Its successor, the PC-9801F, employs an 8086-2 CPU, which can selectively run at a speed of either 5 or 8 MHz. The F2 model contains two 640 KB 5¼-inch 2DD (quad density) floppy drives, a JIS level 1 kanji (2,965 characters) font ROM, and was priced at 398,000 yen (about US$1,700 in 1983). It was positively received by engineers and businesses. Ozawa explained the reason why the PC-9801F used a 640 KB floppy drive, "For Japanese business softwares, 320 KB is small, 640 KB is just barely enough, and 1 MB is preferable. We want to choose a 1 MB floppy drive, but its 8-inch drive is expensive, and its 5-inch drive lacks reliability. So, we think 640 KB is the best choice. Also, it can read a 320 KB floppy disk".

The Electronic Devices Group launched the PC-100 in October 1983 and attempted to present a GUI similar to the Apple Lisa. The PC-100 did not sell well due to its time and high cost. Moreover, the marketing competed with the PC-98 of the Information Processing Group, which did not assure distributors. In December 1983, Ouchi decided that NEC would consolidate their personal computer business into two divisions: NEC Home Electronics to deal with the 8-bit home computer line, and Nippon Electric's Information Processing Group to deal with the 16-bit personal computer line. The Electronic Device Group passed off their personal computer business to NEC Home Electronics.

Fujitsu released the FM-16β in December 1984. It has an Intel 80186 CPU at 8 MHz and a 1.2 MB 5¼-inch 2HD (high density) floppy drive. The FM-16β failed because it bundled CP/M-86, not MS-DOS, and was marketed by Fujitsu's Electronic Devices department instead of the Computers department. They modified their policies in mid-1985, but it was too late. In another incident, Fujitsu bundled a business software package with the FM-11 (predecessor to FM-16β) which discouraged users from purchasing third-party software and forced them to use it for a specific purpose, which caused Fujitsu to fail to expand their platform.

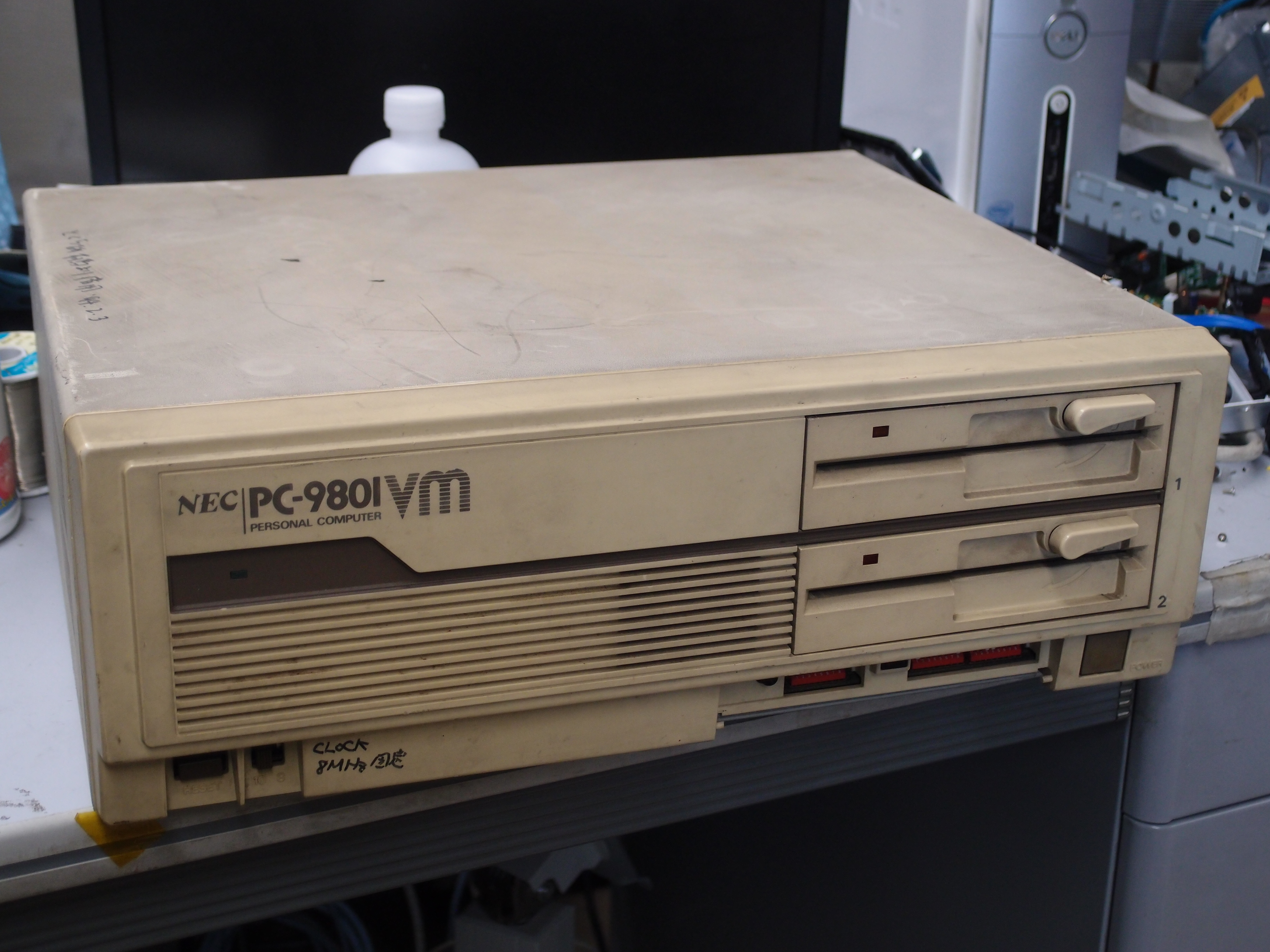
PC-9801VM (1985)

NEC introduced the PC-9801M2 that has two 5¼-inch 2HD floppy drives against the release of FM-16β. This model cannot read 2DD floppy disks. The PC-9801VM uses an NEC V30 CPU clocked at 10 MHz, and was released in July 1985. The VM2 model shipped with two 5¼-inch 2HD floppy drives and supports both 2DD and 2HD floppy disks. It became the best-selling computer in Japan, with annual sales of 210,000 units.

Usage share of personal computers at home as of 1989. 509 Japanese businessmen answered.

Usage share of 36,165 personal computers in 937 Japanese companies as of 1989

NEC permitted software companies to bundle a subset of MS-DOS 2.11 without a license fee between 1983 and 1987. ASCII and Microsoft allowed it to enter the market and compete with CP/M-86. NEC also let users buy a self-contained application package. It occupied half of the Japanese personal computer market at the end of 1983. As of March 1984, 700 software packages were available for PC-98. In 1987, NEC announced one million PC-98s were shipped, and about 3,000 software packages were available. Masayoshi Son recalled in 1985 that:

The gap in share of the personal computer market is growing. Even though the start was not limited to NEC only, why did this gap cause? It can be said that NEC has taken a positive attitude towards disclosing hardware and operating systems since the early period, and free for third parties to develop software and peripherals. While the competitors adopted the same Microsoft's BASIC, they didn't disclose them. This difference in attitude is reflected in today's share.

NEC took care to maintain compatibility and inheritance. The PC-9801VM can select a clock frequency between 8 and 10 MHz and also offers an optional 8086 card because the V30 has different instruction cycles. The V30 has unique instructions which are not implemented in other Intel x86 processors. Some PC-98 applications use them, so the PC-9801VX (1986) was designed to run Intel 80286 and V30 selectively. The PC-9801RA (1988) has an Intel 80386 and a V30. The PC-9801DA (1990) does not have this, but its clock speed is configurable.

NEC focused heavily on financing advertisements and exhibitions, from ¥1,000,000,000 in the 1970s, to over ¥25,000,000,000 in 1985.

While NEC did not market these specific machines in the West, it sold the NEC APC III, which had similar hardware as early PC-98 models. However, NEC began selling an IBM clone (APC IV) outside Japan in 1986. By 1990, 2 million PC-9800/9801 units were sold in Japan.

=== Race with laptops and PC-98 clones ===
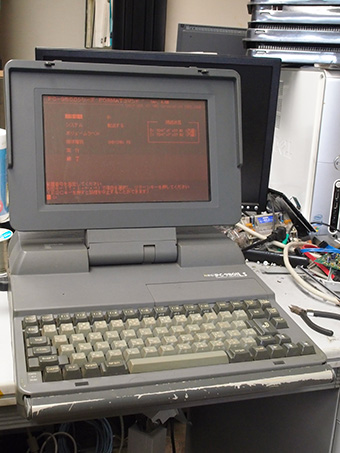
PC-9801LS (1988)

Toshiba had developed laptop computers since the autumn of 1983, while their desktops were a failure in the Japanese PC market. In October 1986, they introduced the J-3100 which allowed the T3100 to handle Japanese text. NEC did not expect it to become the first successful laptop computer. In Japan, a typical office layout is an open office that is made up of rows of tight desks, so laptop computers received a good reception from corporate customers. In the same month, NEC introduced the PC-98LT laptop computer. This model had poor compatibility with the PC-9801 and could not gain a significant profit. NEC understood, despite difficulties, that the PC-98 needed a new custom chipset to make the motherboard smaller.

In March 1987, Epson announced the first PC-98 clone desktop computer and named it the PC-286 series. NEC investigated and sued Epson on the claim that its BIOS infringed their copyright. Epson canceled their PC-286 model 1-4 and released the PC-286 model 0 whose BIOS was made by another team under a clean room design; it did not have a built-in BASIC interpreter. NEC countered that the PC-286 model 0 lacked compatibility with the PC-98. Although it seemed NEC would not be able to win the lawsuit, Epson settled with NEC in November 1987 after considering the damage that would be done to their reputation.

Advert in ASCII August 1987 issue. The headline says "Offices know the real thing."

The PC-286 model 0 employs an Intel 80286 processor operating at 10 MHz—25% faster than NEC's PC-9801VX using the same CPU at 8 MHz. In June 1987, NEC released a 10 MHz version of the PC-9801VX (VX01, VX21 and VX41 models). They added a BIOS signature check to their operating systems to prevent non-NEC machines from booting the OSes; it was commonly called an "EPSON check". In September 1987, Epson introduced the PC-286V and the PC-286U and also released the BASIC Support ROM to add a BASIC interpreter to their computers. Epson also bundled the Software Installation Program which was a patch kit to remove the EPSON check. Both machines were received well due to their reasonable prices and better compatibility. In 1988, Epson made annual sales of 200,000 units and successfully established PC-98 clones in the Japanese PC market.

In October 1987, Epson released the PC-286L which was a PC-98 compatible laptop before NEC started development of their own laptop. In March 1988, NEC released the PC-9801LV which was a 100% PC-98 compatible laptop. It was accomplished by three custom VLSI chips. These chipsets are also used in other desktops such as the PC-9801UV11 and the PC-9801RA.

In July 1989, Toshiba released the J-3100SS branded as the DynaBook, a true laptop computer which was light and battery operated. It made annual sales of 170,000 units. Four months later, NEC released the PC-9801N and branded it as the "98NOTE". The DynaBook started off well but the 98NOTE outsold it in 1990.

Microsoft and other PC manufacturers developed the AX specification in 1987. It allowed IBM PC clones to handle Japanese text by using special video chips, the Japanese keyboard, and software written for it. However, the AX could not break into the Japanese PC market due to its higher cost and less compatible software.

Sharp X68000 and Fujitsu FM Towns intended to offer a multimedia platform for home users. Both have rich graphics and sound capabilities in comparison to the basic configuration of PC-98. They enjoyed modest success, but not enough to threaten the domination of the PC-98.

The Nikkei Personal Computing magazine stated in January 1992 that "users choose a PC with considering compatibility and expandability. The PC-9800 compatibles is the most popular, and the IBM PC/AT compatibles also gains their strong support. PC users are stubborn and conservative. We conclude these opinions are related to the slump in other PC sales including Fujitsu FMR, Sharp X68000, AX machines, Canon Navi and rapidly declining 8-bit machines like MSX."

=== As a PC game platform ===
Japanese domestic PC shipments by bit designs from 1983 to 1993

In the early 1980s, home users chose 8-bit machines rather than 16-bit machines because 16-bit systems were expensive and designed exclusively for business. By the mid-1980s, the Japanese home computer market was dominated by the NEC PC-88, the FM-7, and the Sharp X1. In this era, simulation games was the most popular genre for PC-98, which took advantage of higher clock speed and larger memory reserves. The Daisenryaku series and the Romance of the Three Kingdoms series were particularly popular and they established PC-98 as a PC game platform.

Towards the end of the 1980s, the Japanese PC game platform slowly shifted from PC-88 to PC-98, as the X68000 and the FM Towns also had a niche market. In the 1990s, many computer role-playing games were developed for the PC-98 or imported from other platforms, such as Brandish, Dungeon Master and the Alone in the Dark series. The higher display resolution and higher storage capacity allowed better graphics, but because of the PC-98's lack of hardware sprites, most of the games made for the system were slow-paced. As a result of this limitation, adult dating sims and visual novels appeared as a revival of 1980's adventure games and gained popularity, such as Dōkyūsei and YU-NO. After the PC-98 declined, many Japanese PC game developers shifted the game platform to video game consoles, except for eroge distributed by computer stores.

=== Price war with DOS/V PCs ===
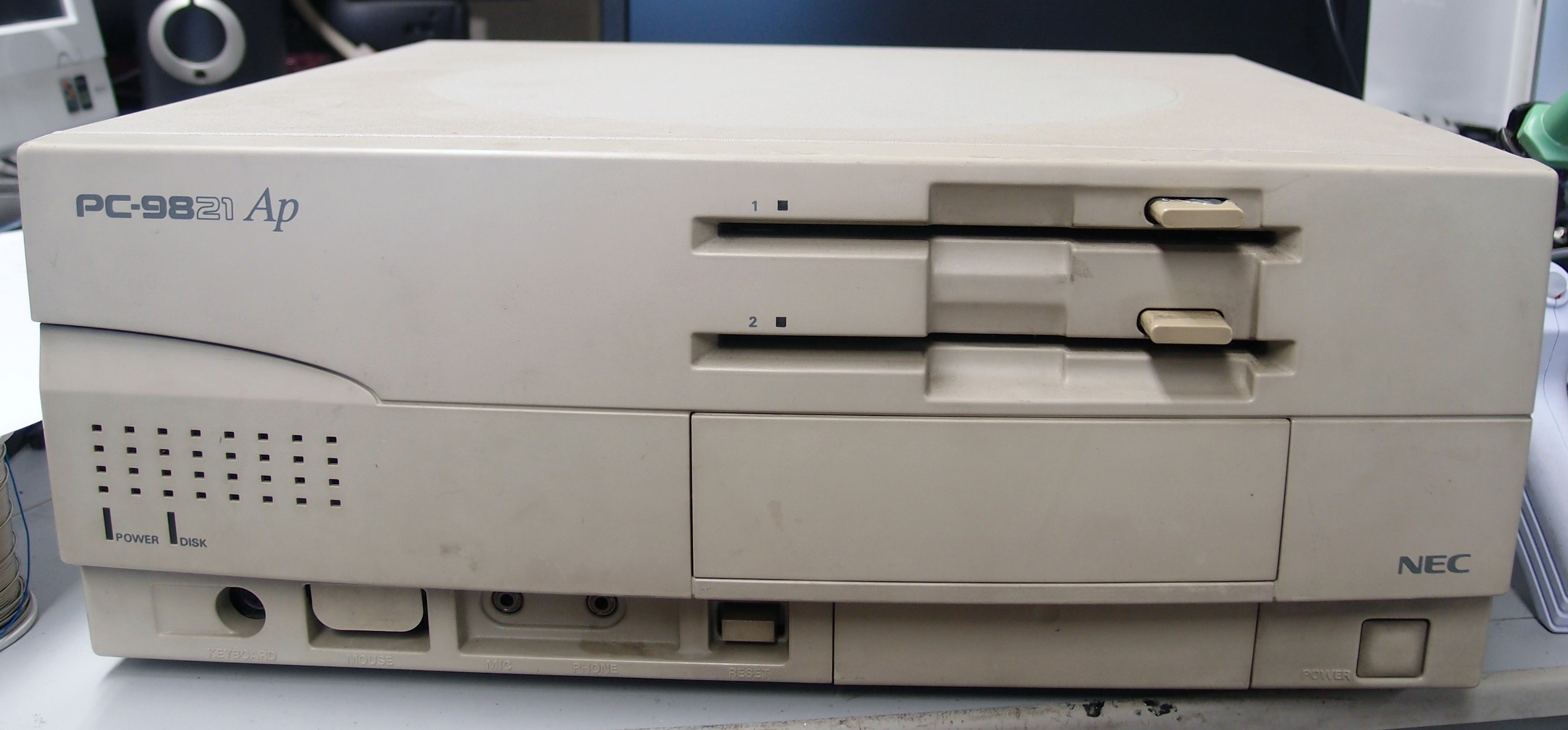
PC-9821Ap (1993)

In the 1980s and early 1990s, NEC dominated the Japanese domestic PC market with more than 60% of the PCs sold as PC-9801 or PC-8801. In 1990, IBM Japan introduced the DOS/V operating system which enabled displaying Japanese text on standard IBM PC/AT VGA adapters. Other Japanese PC manufacturers joined the PC Open Architecture Developer Group (OADG) organized by IBM Japan and Microsoft. In October 1992, Compaq released a DOS/V computer priced at ¥128,000 compared to the lowest priced PC-98 at ¥248,000, causing a price war in the Japanese PC market. In 1993, Toshiba introduced DOS/V computers, Epson founded Epson Direct Corporation to sell DOS/V computers, and Fujitsu started selling DOS/V computers branded as FMV.

"Which is the PC you want to buy next?" (May 1993)

In November 1992, NEC introduced a mid-range Windows PC, the PC-9821 which contained an Intel 386SX processor, a CD-ROM drive, 16-bit PCM audio playback, MS-DOS 5.0A, and Windows 3.0A. In January 1993, PC-98 desktops were expanded into three lines: a high-performance Windows-based line named "98MATE", a low-priced MS-DOS line named "98FELLOW", and an all-in-one desktop line named "98MULTi". PC-98s were still popular among Japanese users because they had many applications.

NEC managed to adopt industrial standards and reduce costs. From 1993 to 1995, the PC-98 adopted 72-pin SIMMs, the 3.5-inch 1.44 MB floppy format, IDE storage drives, a 640×480 DOS screen mode, 2D GUI acceleration GPUs, Windows Sound System, PCI slots, and PCMCIA card slots. NEC had outsourced manufacturing of motherboards to Taiwanese companies such as ECS and GVC (acquired by Lite-On).

=== Decline ===
Aside from other Japanese domestic platforms which had disappeared, Windows 95 overturned the dominance of the PC-98. The difference in the architecture was not only ineffective for platform-independent environments but also increasing development resources to adopt them.

During the development of Windows 95, NEC sent an average of 20 engineers to Microsoft's office in Seattle. Even though the PC-98 uses some IBM clone components, Windows requires the special driver or HAL to support its IRQ, I/O and C-Bus. The Nikkei Personal Computing magazine wrote, "The PC-98 features a number of MS-DOS applications, but there is no difference between PC-98 and PC/AT clones for using Windows 95. The status of the PC-98 series is not based on its hardware feature or the number of softwares and peripherals, but its strength in promotion, parts procurement and faith in the NEC brand."

In 1997, NEC introduced the PC98-NX series as a main personal computer line that conformed to the PC System Design Guide and was Windows-based IBM PC compatible but not DOS/V compatible. The PC-9801's last successor was the Celeron-based PC-9821Ra43 (with a clock frequency of 433 MHz, using a 440FX chipset-based motherboard design from 1998), which appeared in 2000. NEC announced that the PC-98 would be discontinued in 2003. 18.3 million PC-98s shipped by the end of shipments in March 2004. The last version of Windows to support PC-98 is Windows 2000; The PC-98 community unofficially ported Windows XP to PC-98 in 2026.

== Hardware ==
The PC-98 is different from the IBM PC in many ways; for instance, it uses its own 16-bit C-bus (Cバス) instead of the ISA bus; BIOS, I/O port addressing, memory management and graphics output are also different. However, localized MS-DOS, Unix, OS/2, or Windows will still run on PC-9801s.

=== Expansion bus ===
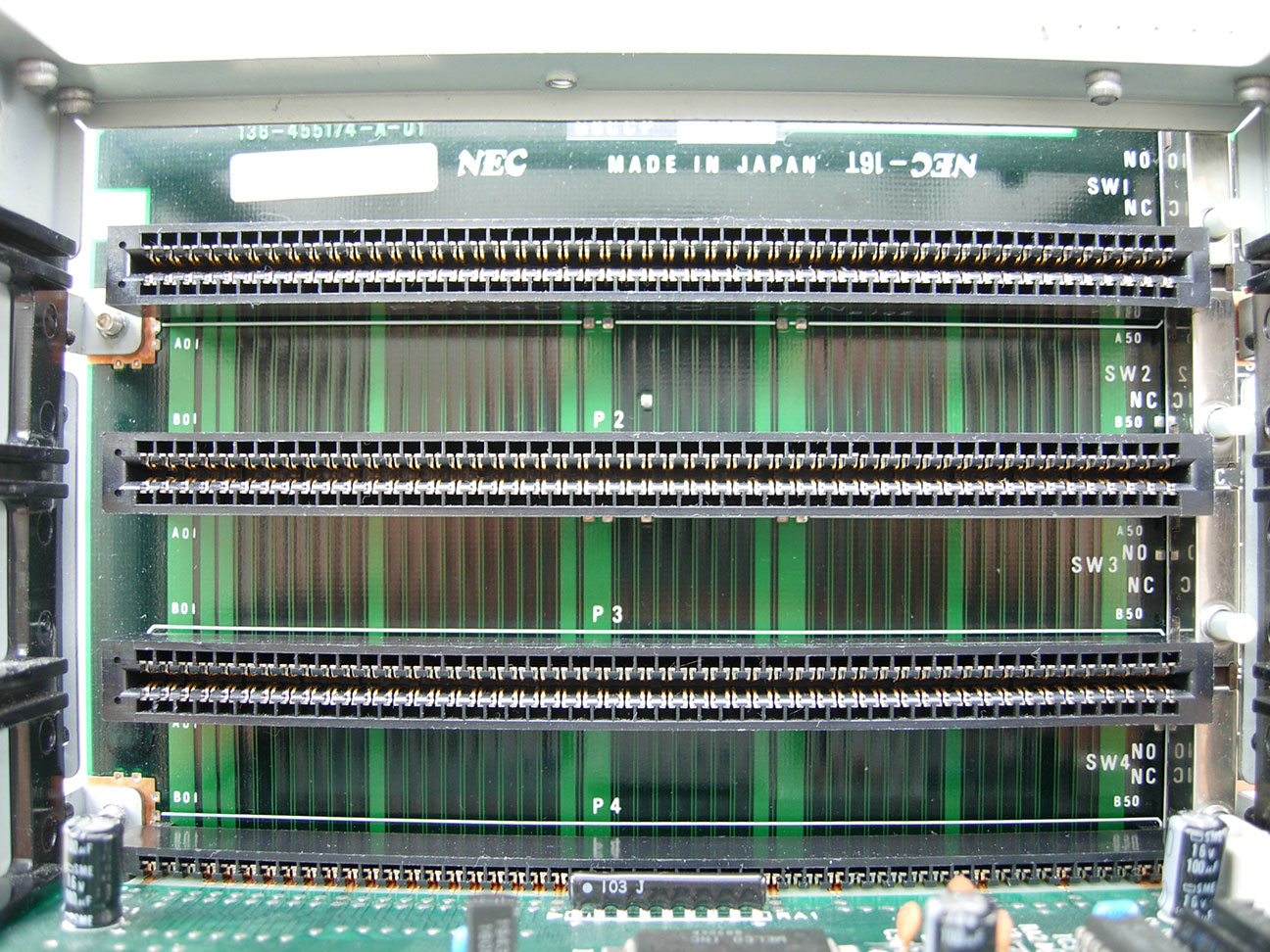
Expansion slot (C-bus)

All PC-98 desktop models use a 100-pin expansion slot. It has 16 data lines and 24 address lines. The bus frequency is fixed at 5, 8 or 10 MHz. The PC-H98 and PC-9821A series computers use a proprietary 32-bit local bus slot along with 16-bit slots. The 16-bit expansion bus was also called C-bus (Compatible Bus). The PC-9821Xf introduced in 1994 shipped with C-bus slots and PCI slots on the motherboard, replacing the proprietary local bus slot.

=== Memory ===
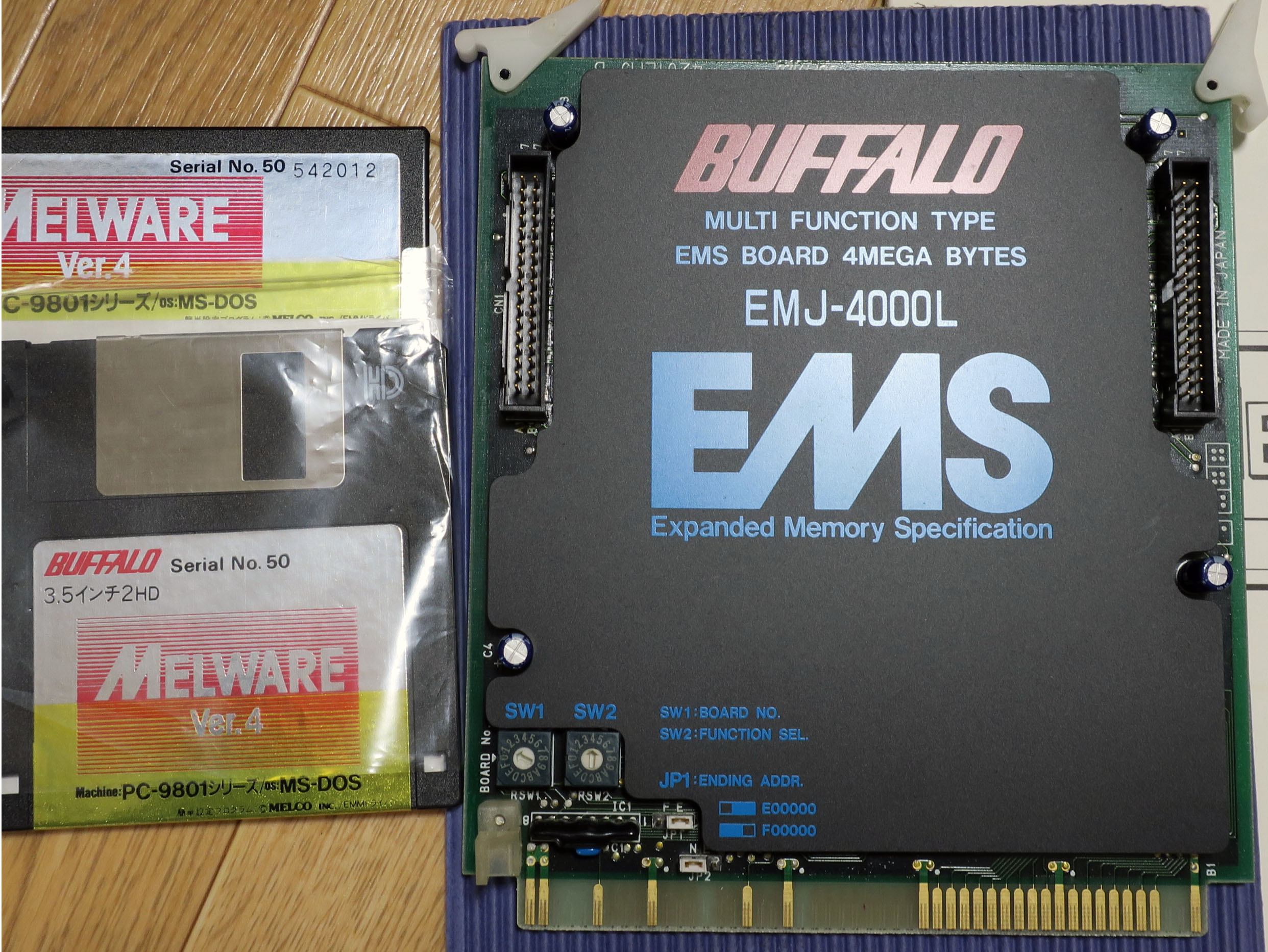
4 MB memory board for C-bus

Many PC-9801 models can increase system memory by installing expansion boards, daughterboards, or proprietary SIMMs. They are limited to 14.6 MB, due to 24-bit address pins and reserve space. EMS memory boards for C-bus are also available. The PC-9821Af introduced in 1993 shipped with standard 72-pin SIMMs, broke the 14.6 MB barrier, and supported memory up to 79.6 MB. Later desktop models shipped with standard SIMM or DIMM memory.

The PC-98XA (1985) and its successors, called high-resolution machine or simply hi-reso machine, are capable of 768 KB base memory, but their I/O ports and memory addressing are quite different from normal PC-98s.

=== Storage ===
Early PC-9801 models supported 1232 KB 8-inch floppy drives and/or 640 KB 5 1/4-inch floppy drives. Each used different IRQ lines and I/O ports. Later models support both interfaces. High density 5 1/4-inch and 3 1/2-inch floppy disks use the same logical format and data rate as 1232 KB 8-inch floppy disks. They became a non-standard format while formats brought by IBM PC/AT and PS/2 became the industry standard.

The PC-98 supports up to four floppy drives. If the system is booted from a floppy drive, MS-DOS assigns letters to all of the floppy drives before considering hard drives; it does the opposite if it is booted from a hard drive. If the OS was installed on the hard drive, MS-DOS would assign the hard drive as drive "A:" and the floppy as drive "B:"; this would cause incompatibility among Windows PC applications, although it can be resolved with the SETUP command in Windows 95 by turning on the "/AT" switch to assign the Windows system drive to the standard "C:" drive.

The PC-98 uses several different interfaces of hard drives. Early models used Shugart Associates System Interface (SASI) or ST506, and later models used SCSI or IDE drives.

=== Graphics ===
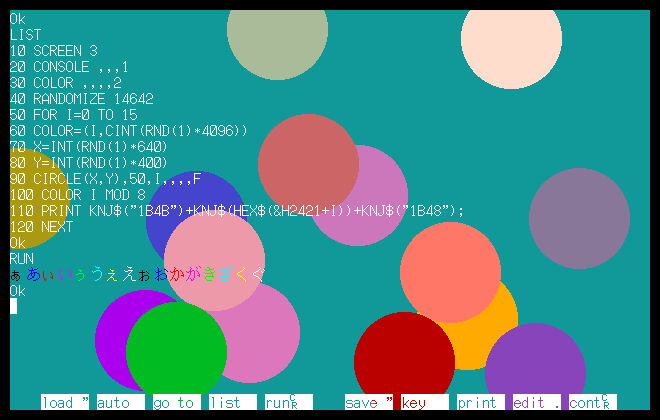
Drawing 8 color characters and 16 color background.

A standard PC-98 has two μPD7220 display controllers (a master and a slave) with 12 KB and 256 KB of video RAM respectively. The master display controller provides video timings and the memory address for the character generator, and the character generator generates a video signal from two bytes of the character code and a single byte of the attribute. The font ROM contains over 7,000 glyphs including the single-byte character set JIS X 0201 and the double-byte character set JIS X 0208, although early models provided the double-byte character set as an option. Each character has a variety of display options, including bits for secret, blinking, reverse, underline, and three intensity bits (grayscale or RGB). The other display controller is set to slave mode and connected to 256 KB of planar video memory, allowing it to display 640 × 400 pixel graphics with 16 colors out of a palette of 4096. This video RAM is divided into pages (2 pages × 4 planes × 32 KB in 640 × 400 with 16 colors), and the programmer can control which page is written to and which page is output. The slave display controller synchronizes with the master, so the text screen can be overlapped onto the graphics.

The high-resolution machines (PC-98XA, XL and PC-H98) offered an 1120 × 750 display mode and aimed for tasks such as CAD and word processing.

The PC-9801U (optional) and VM introduced a custom chipset GRCG (GRaphic CharGer) to access several planar memory in parallel. The PC-9801VX introduced a blitter chip called the EGC (Enhanced Graphic Charger). It had raster operations and bit shifting.

In 1993, NEC introduced a 2D Windows accelerator card for PC-98, called the Window Accelerator Board, which employed an S3 86C928. Video cards for C-bus, local bus and PCI are also available from other manufacturers. DirectX 7.0a is the last official supported version for PC-98.

=== Sound ===
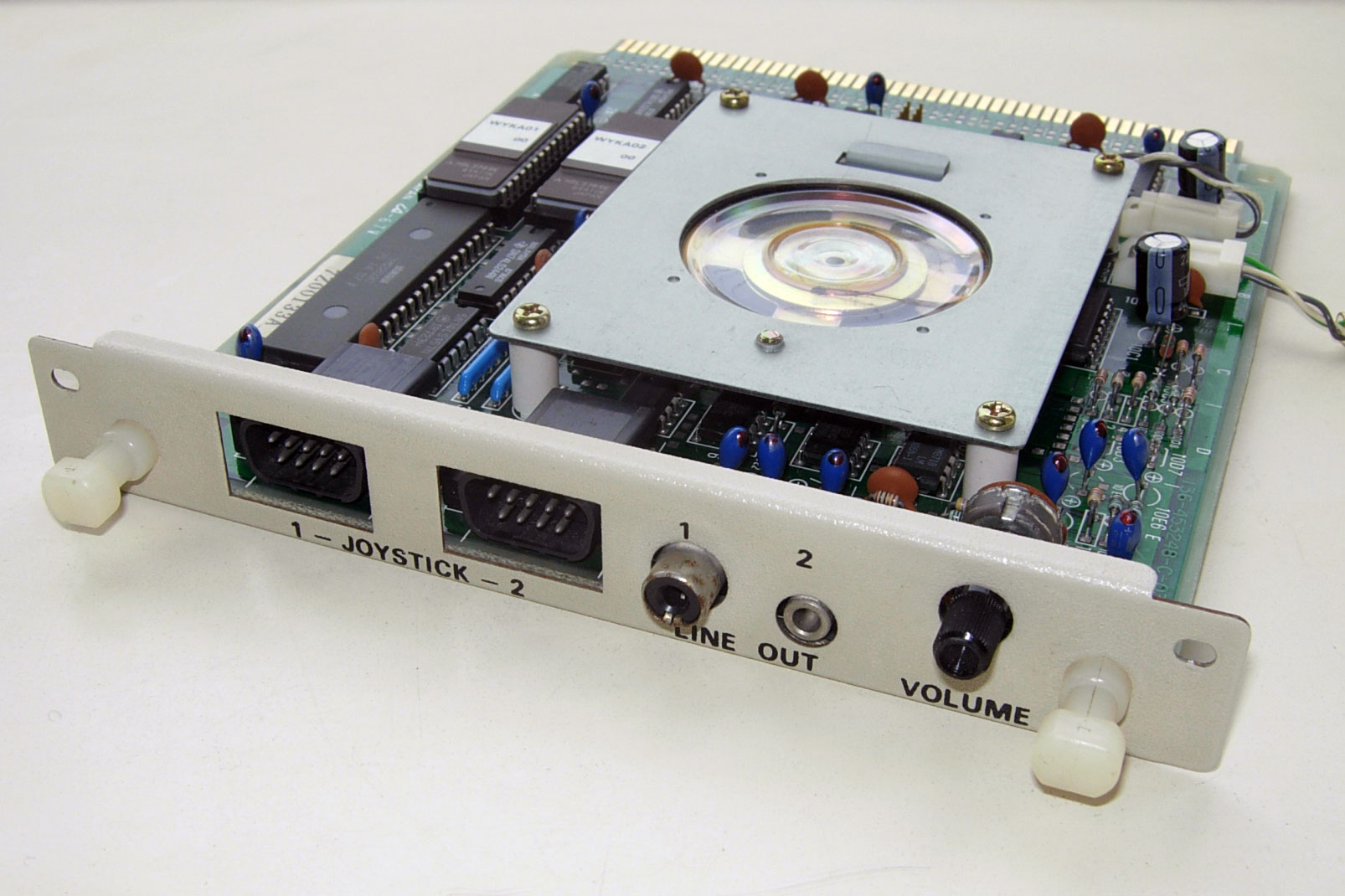
PC-9801-26K Sound Board

The first generation of PC-9801s (the E, F and M models) only have an internal buzzer. PC-9801U2 and later models can change the sound frequency by controlling the programmable interval timer, like the PC speaker. The PC-8801mkIISR home computer, introduced in 1985, has a Yamaha YM2203 FM synthesis, an Atari joystick port and BASIC sound commands. The optional PC-9801-26 sound card is based around these features, although in some PC-9801 models it is integrated with the motherboard. It was replaced by the PC-9801-26K to support the 80286 CPU. This became the most common sound card for playing in-game music on the PC-98.

The PC-9801-26K was succeeded by the PC-9801-73 (1991) and PC-9801-86 (1993) sound card, which employs the YM2608 FM synthesis and adds support for CD-quality PCM playback. The latter has a reasonable price and fully backward compatibility with the 26K sound card, so it gained strong support in PC games. Due to lack of DMA support and poor sound drivers, it often has issues in Windows and created popping and clicking sounds. Late PC-9821 models use the Crystal Semiconductor's Windows Sound System audio codec to resolve this, but the newer sound chip is not compatible with the older conventional sound cards. The PC-9801-118 (1995) sound card has both the YMF297 (hybrid of YM2608 and YMF262) and the WSS audio, but its PCM playback is not compatible with the 86 sound card.

Roland released a music production starter kit for PC-98, which combines the MT-32 synthesizer module, a MIDI interface card and a MIDI editing software. Creative Labs developed a C-bus variant of Sound Blaster 16.

=== Keyboard ===
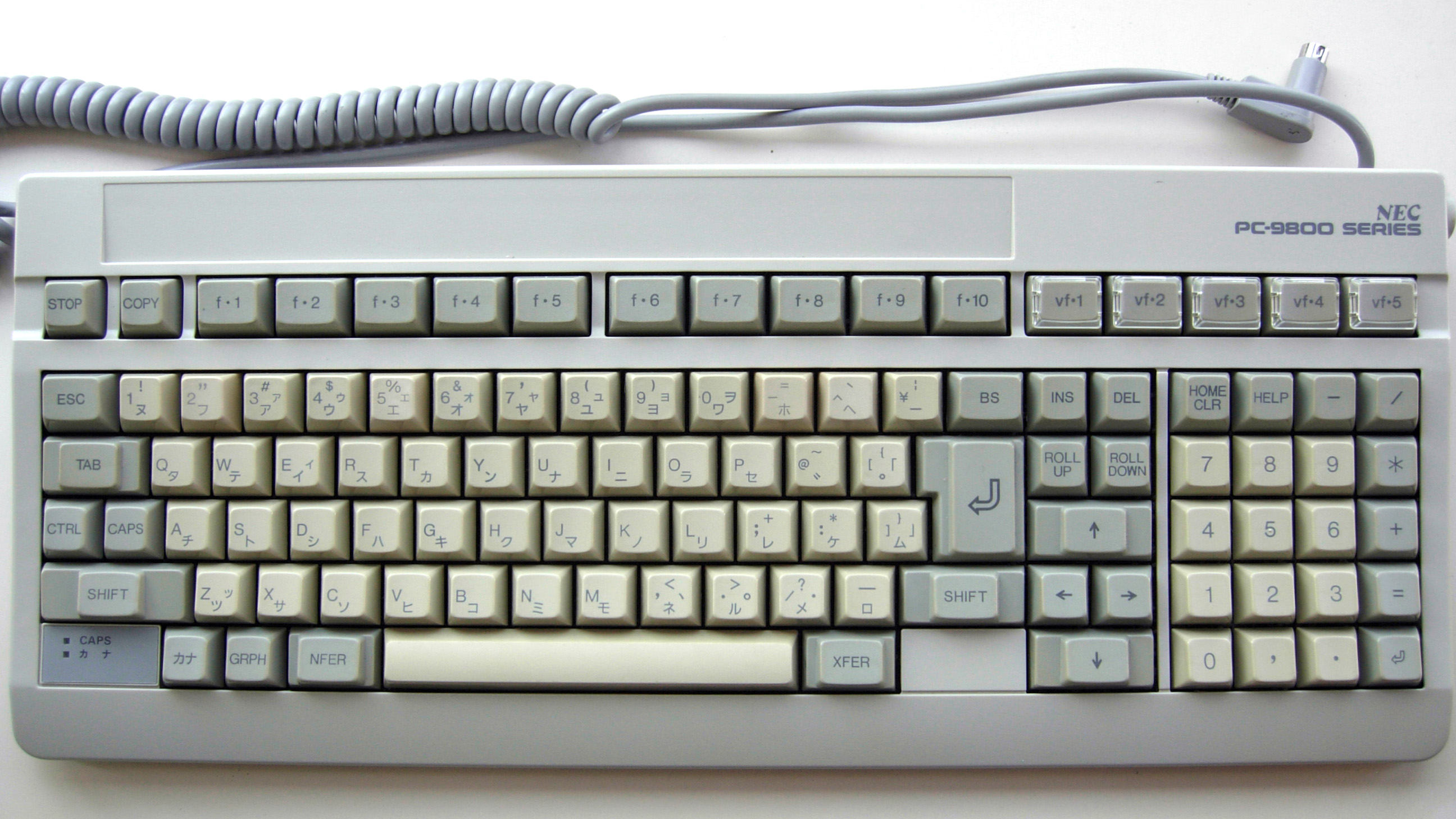
Typical PC-98 keyboard

The first PC-9801 model has the same keyboard layout as the PC-8801's except it adds conversion key XFER and five function keys. Later models have some minor changes: NFER, 15 function keys, LED status indicators, and replacing CAPS and Kana (カナ) alternate action switches.

=== Mouse ===
The bus mouse and interface card kit was introduced for PC-98 in 1983. The PC-9801F3 and later models have a mouse interface. Although the PS/2 port became popular among IBM PC clones in the 1990s, the bus mouse was used until the end of PC-98.

== Epson clones ==
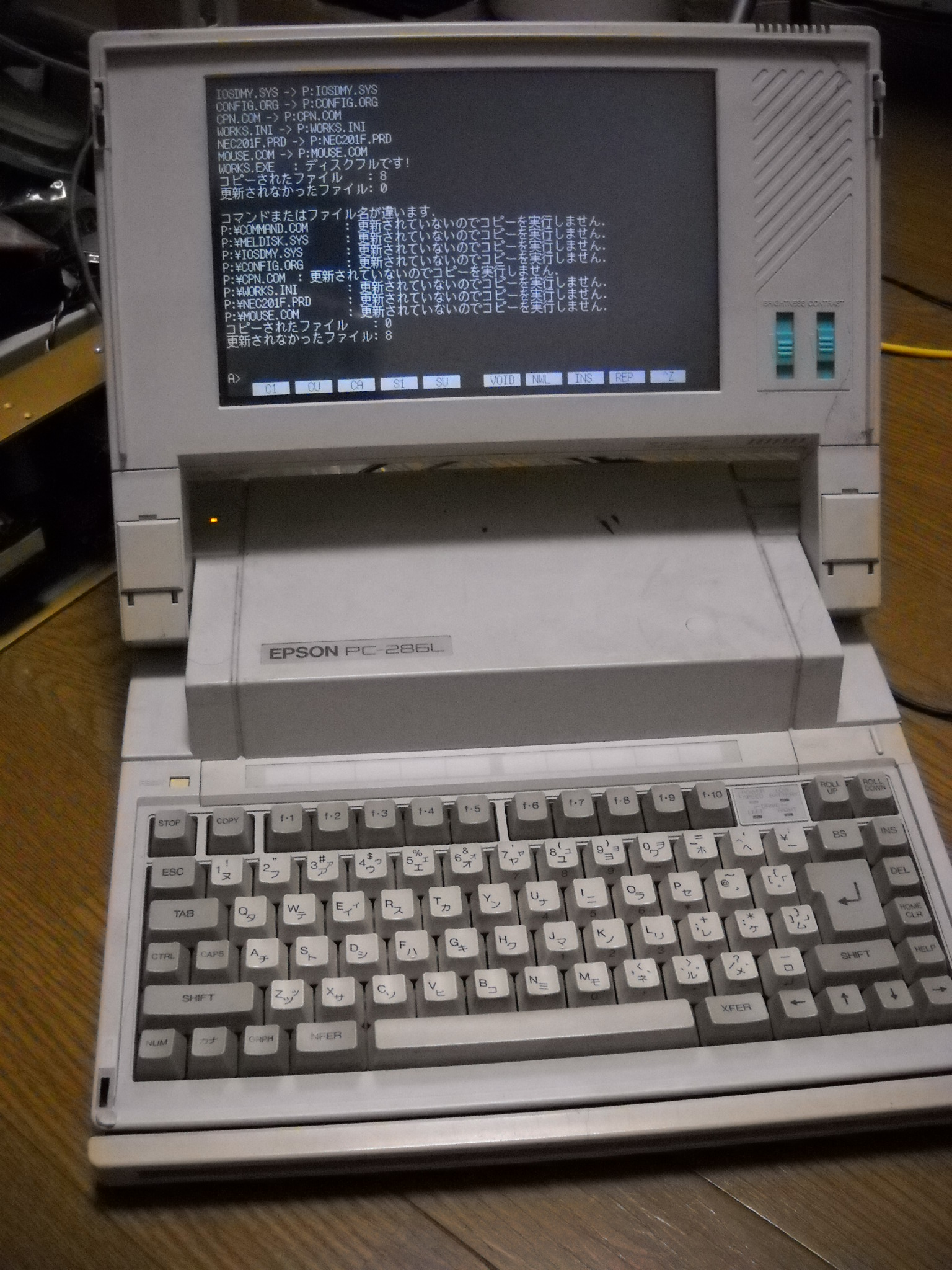
Epson PC-286L

Seiko Epson manufactured PC-9801 clones between 1987 and 1995, as well as compatible peripherals.

In the 1980s, Epson's clones preceded NEC's in terms of its features such as performance and portability. In the early 1990s, Epson concentrated a line of low-priced computer which had low profit margins, but it did not sell well. This made resellers negative. Also, NEC had strong sales in the enterprise market, but Epson did not. Manufacturers of DOS/V computers began to get sales channels, and they became competitors for the PC-98 and its Epson clones. Nikkei Personal Computing magazine reported in 1992 that "NEC has various opinions inside the company about the future PC-98, and it is doubtful whether the PC-98 will continue to be the domestic standard. The decline of the 98 compatible machine business may lead to the decline of the PC-98 itself".

In May 1992, Epson released a high performance machine, the PC-486GR. It has a 32-bit local bus for graphic processing and an Intel 486SX CPU running at 20 MHz, which was faster than NEC's flagship PC-9801FA, which had a 486SX running at 16 MHz. In January 1993, NEC released the 98MATE to compete with Epson's clones and DOS/V computers.

From 1992 to 1994, Epson sold about 200,000 units of PC-98 clones every year. As of 1994, Epson expected only 40% growth in their PC sales despite they expected 100% growth in their peripherals sales by 1995. However, Nikkei Personal Computer magazine expected that Epson would continue manufacturing PC-98 clones for a while because NEC had kept a 50% share of the Japanese PC market.

AST Research Japan released the DualStation 386 SX/16 in 1990 which was both PC-9801 and IBM PC compatible, but it failed because of poor marketing.

Sharp, Sanyo and Seikosha each worked on PC-98 clones, but all gave up. An executive of Sanyo said, "NEC paid far more attention to its copyright than we had imagined. We decided that the loss of our corporate image would be greater than its profit, and cancelled the 98 compatible machine business."

== Software ==
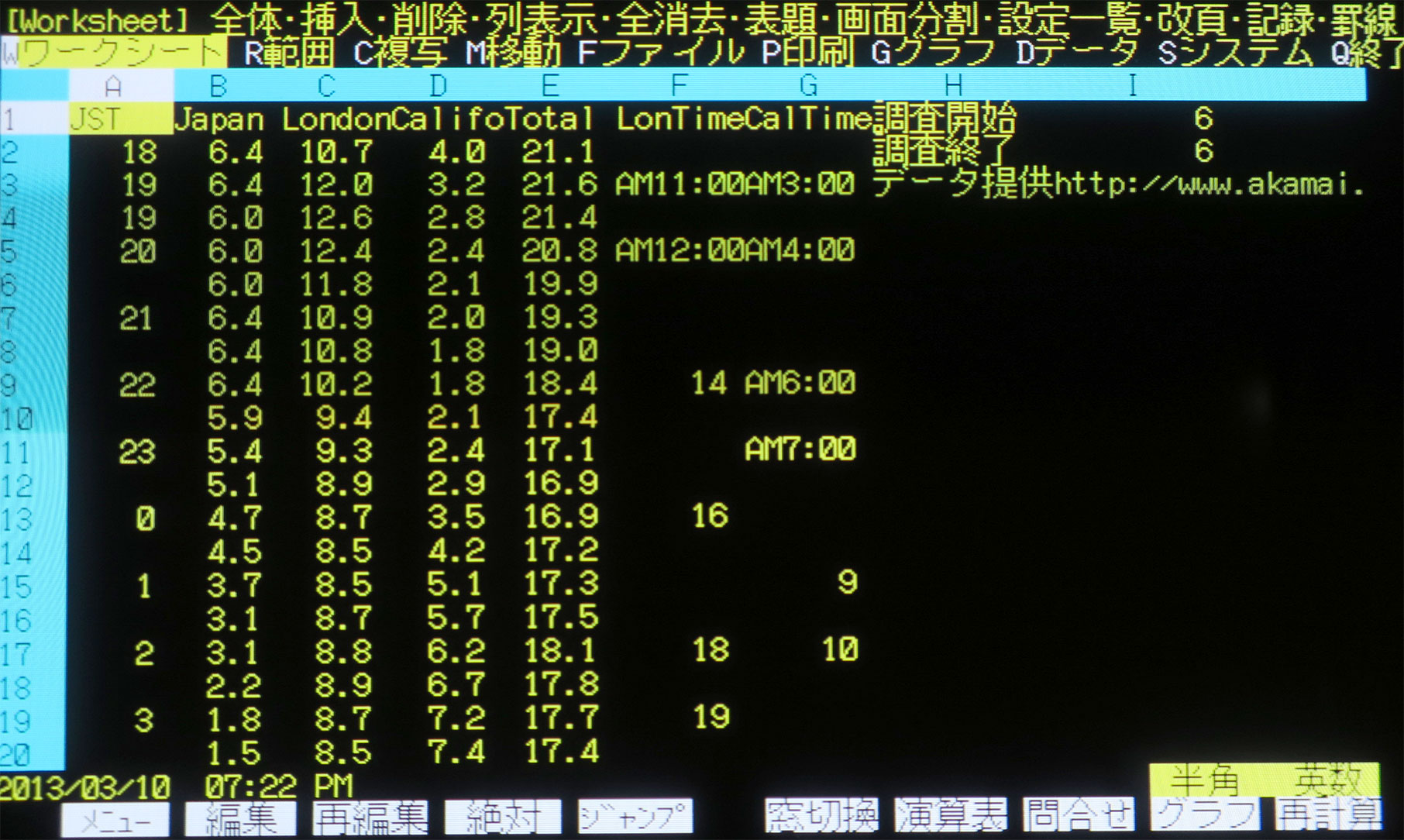
Lotus 1-2-3 for PC-98

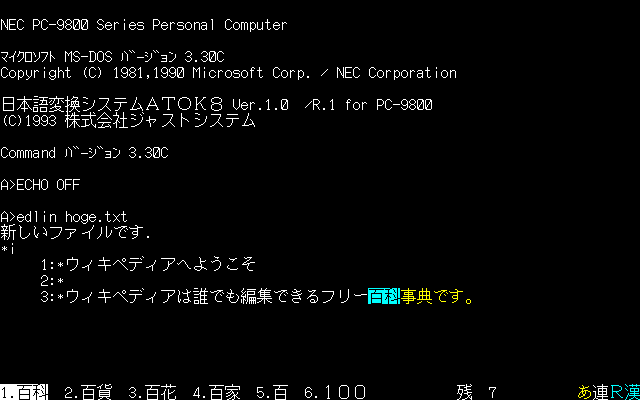
Using Edlin for typing Japanese with the ATOK 8 input method editor, running on MS-DOS 3.3C

The PC-98 was primarily used for businesses and industry in Japan from 1980s to mid-1990s. As of September 1992, out of 16,000 PC-98 software applications, 60% of them were corporate business software applications (including CAD), 10% of them were operating systems and development tools, 10% of them were educational software applications, with the rest being a mix of graphic design, networking, word processing and games. The Nikkei Personal Computing magazine reported in 1993 that most home users purchased PCs to complete office work at home. The publisher sent a questionnaire to 2000 readers, and out of 1227 readers who answered, 82% of users used it for word processing, 72% for spreadsheets, 47% as a database, and 43% for games.

Ichitaro, a Japanese word processor for the PC-98 and considered one of its killer applications, was released in 1985 and ported to other machines in 1987. A Japanese version of Lotus 1-2-3 was also ported to PC-98 first in 1986. 1 million copies of all Ichitaro versions and 500,000 copies of Lotus 1-2-3 were shipped by 1991.

PC-98 software generally ran from program and data disks (Disk 0 & 1 or A & B). For example, Ichitaro's system disk contained a runtime version of MS-DOS, main programs, an input method editor (ATOK) and its dictionary file. It used the entire space of an 1.2 MB floppy disk. In 1980s, most machines only had two floppy drives because HDDs were an expensive additional feature.

NEC provided a variety of operating systems including CP/M-86, Concurrent CP/M, MS-DOS, PC-UX, OS/2 and Windows (discontinued after Windows 2000). Localized versions of NetWare and FreeBSD were also available.

The PC-98 had many game titles designed for it, many of which made creative use of the system's limitations (as it was originally designed as a business machine) to great commercial success. Despite having hardware specifications inferior to the FM Towns and the X68000, the massive install base and steady flow of game titles, in particular "dōjin" style dating sims and role-playing games, as well as games such as Policenauts, YU-NO: A Girl Who Chants Love at the Bound of this World, early Touhou Project games, Koutetsu no Kishi, Mayonaka no Tantei Nightwalker, MechWarrior, Rusty, Hiōden: Mamono-tachi tono Chikai, Shūjin e no Pert-em-Hru, Corpse Party, Slayers, and J.B. Harold Murder Club, kept it as the favored platform for PC game developers in Japan until the rise of the DOS/V clones.

== Models ==
Partial list of PC-98 models sold in the Japanese market (no 1992–2000 models, no notebook models, etc.).

Model	CPU	Year	Features	Other
PC-9801	8086 @ 5 MHz	1982	128 KB RAM, 6 C-bus slots, larger DIN connector for keyboard	640×400 8 colors, 2 external 8" floppy drives (optional); 298,000yen
PC-9801E	8086-2 @ 5 or 8 MHz	1983	Essentially the same as PC-9801, integrated logical circuits into several ASICs, mini DIN keyboard connector	2 external 8" floppy drives (optional)
PC-9801F	8086-2 @ 5 or 8 MHz	1983	Included JIS level 1 kanji characters in ROM; F1 and F2 came with 128KB of RAM; F3 came with 256 KB of RAM and a 10 MB hard disk	Internal 2DD (640KB/720KB) 5.25" floppy drive
PC-9801M	8086-2 @ 5 or 8 MHz	1984	Included a bus mouse interface	M1: 2 internal 2HD (1.2 MB) 5.25" floppy drives; M2: 1 internal 2HD 5.25" floppy drive and a 20 MB HD
PC-9801U	NEC V30 @ 8 MHz	1985	Included JIS level 1 and level 2 kanji characters in ROM	2 2DD 3.5" floppy drives
PC-9801VF	NEC V30 @ 8 MHz	1985	256 KB RAM, GRCG (Graphic Charger)	2 2DD 5.25" floppy drives 640×400 resolution with 8 colors (16 colors optional) chosen from a palette of 4096
PC-9801VM	NEC V30 @ 10 MHz	1985	384 KB RAM, GRCG	2 2HD/2DD 5.25" floppy drives 640×400 resolution with 8 colors (16 colors optional) chosen from a palette of 4096
PC-9801UV	NEC V30 @ 8 or 10 MHz	1986	Onboard PC-9801-26 sound hardware, GRCG; UV2 (1986) came with 384 KB of RAM; UV21 (1987) came with 640 KB of RAM; UV11 (1988) was 45% the size of the UV21 and had 73% lower power consumption	2 2HD/2DD 3.5" floppy drives
PC-9801VX	80286 @ 8 or 10 MHz	1986	640 KB RAM, EGC (Enhanced Graphic Charger), VCCI compliance	640×400 resolution with 16 colors chosen from among 4096; VX4/WN bundled MS-DOS 3.1 and Windows 1.0
PC-9801UX	80286 @ 10 MHz	1987	Onboard 26K sound, EGC	2 2HD/2DD 3.5" floppy drives
PC-9801RA	80386DX @ 16 or 20 MHz	1988	Reduced size by 12% in comparison to the 9801VX, covered floppy drives to dampen sound	2 2HD/2DD 5.25" floppy drives
PC-9801RS	80386SX @ 16 MHz	1989		2 2HD/2DD 5.25" floppy drives
PC-9801RX	80286 @ 12 MHz	1988		2 2HD/2DD 5.25" floppy drives
PC-9801ES	80386SX @ 16 MHz	1989	ES2: no HD; ES5: 40MB HD	2 2HD/2DD 3.5" floppy drives
PC-9801EX	80286 @ 12 MHz	1989	Onboard 26K sound	2 2HD/2DD 3.5" floppy drives
PC-9801DA,DA/U	80386DX @ 20 MHz	1990	Onboard 26K sound, software menus replaced DIP switches	/U means 3.5" floppy drives No /U means 5.25" floppy drives
PC-9801DS,DS/U	80386SX @ 16 MHz	1990	Onboard 26K sound	/U means 3.5" floppy drives No /U means 5.25" floppy drives
PC-9801DX,DX/U	80286 @ 12 MHz	1991	Onboard 26K sound	/U means 3.5" floppy drives No /U means 5.25" floppy drives
PC-9801FA,FA/U	80486SX @ 16 MHz	1992	Onboard 26K sound	F means "File slot", proprietary memory expansion slot
PC-9801FS,FS/U	80386DX @ 16 MHz	1992	Onboard 26K sound	
PC-9801FX,FX/U	80386SX @ 16 MHz	1992	Onboard 26K sound	
PC-9821	Intel 80386SX	1992	3.6 MB of RAM, CD-ROM drive, onboard 86 sound hardware	40 MB hard disk, 640x480 resolution with 256 colors, Windows 3.0A pre-installed
PC-9821Ap	80486DX2 @ 66 MHz	1993	3.6 MB of RAM, onboard 86 sound, supports 1.44 MB 3.5" floppy disks	Hard disk: none or 120-510 MB with IDE, 640×480 resolution with 256 colors, MS-DOS 5.0A-H pre-installed
PC-9801BA	80486DX @ 40 MHz	1993	1.6 to 3.6 MB of RAM, 86 sound card (optional), supports 1.44MB 3.5" floppy disks	Hard disk: none or 80 MB with IDE, MS-DOS 5.0A-H pre-installed
PC-9821Ce	80486SX @ 25 MHz	1993	Essentially the same as PC-9821	Windows 3.1 pre-installed
PC-9821Af	Pentium @ 60 MHz	1993	7.6 MB of RAM, broke 14.6 MB memory barrier, JEDEC 72-pin SIMM, S3 928 2D accelerator	510 MB hard disk, Windows 3.1 pre-installed
PC-9821Cx	80486SX @ 33 MHz	1994		MS-DOS 5.0A-H/Windows 3.1 pre-installed
PC-9821Cf	Pentium @ 60 MHz	1994		Built-in TV tuner, MS-DOS 5.0A-H/Windows 3.1 pre-installed
PC-9821Xa	Pentium @ 90 MHz	1994	7.6 MB of RAM, 1x to 4x CD-ROM drive, Matrox MGA-II video accelerator, 2x PCI slots, Plug and Play C-bus, WSS audio	Hard disk: 270 to 1000 MB
PC-9821Cx2	Pentium @ 75 MHz	1995	4x CD-ROM drive	850 MB hard disk, built-in TV tuner, MS-DOS 6.2/Windows 3.1 pre-installed
PC-9821Cx3 (98Multi Canbe)	Pentium @ 100 MHz	1995	Includes Yamaha DB60XG Daughterboard	Windows 95 pre-installed
PC-9821 Valuestar V Series V166-V233	Pentium MMX @ 166 to 233 MHz	1997	8x to 20x CD-ROM, or 2x CD-R, or DVD-ROM drive, 32 MB of RAM, Matrox Mystique 3D accelerator, 3 to 6 GB hard disk, 2x USB ports	Windows 95 OSR2.1 pre-installed
PC-9821 Cereb (C166-C233)	Pentium MMX @ 166 to 233 MHz	1997	28 inch (in C200 Model) or optional 32 inch BS Hi-Vision TV Monitor, 3 or 4 GB hard disk, VideoLogic Apocalypse 3D 3D accelerator (in C166 Model), DVD and MPEG-2 Decoder (in C200/V and C233/V Model), built-in TV tuner, 13x CD-ROM or DVD-ROM drive (read CD-ROM at 6x in C200/V Model and 8x in C233/V Model), 32 MB of RAM, 2x USB ports (in C233 Model)	Windows 95 OSR2.1 pre-installed
PC-9821Ra43	Celeron @ 433 MHz	2000	24x CD-ROM drive, 32 MB of RAM, 8 GB hard disk	Last computer of series

== Reception ==
=== Marketing ===
A journalist explained in 1988 how NEC "established the nation of Japanese personal computers":

- NEC responded quickly to the new demand for business personal computers.
- NEC succeeded in attracting many third-party suppliers and dominated software production and distribution.
- NEC adopted Microsoft's MS-DOS as an operating system for the PC-98.

Western computers lacked Japanese support due to its display resolution and memory, so they could not get into the Japanese PC market until the DOS/V and faster computers came out; for example, IBM Japan sold the IBM 5550 instead of the IBM PC. Yoshihiko Hyodo, a programmer who developed the text editor VZ Editor, said two advantages that the PC-98 had were its kanji character memory and non-interlaced monitor. Both provided users with a more comfortable Japanese environment. A senior vice president of Otsuka Shokai (a computer distributor for enterprises) recalled that "early users such as Kao already had office automation with the PC-8000, but it lacked speed and kanji support. Then, the PC-9800 was released, and it was perfect, so distributors and users immediately switched to it."

Shunzo Hamada of NEC thought the biggest reason for the success of PC-98 was that NEC could get software companies to cooperate. He said, "Third-party suppliers of Japanese PCs had already grown up to a certain extent. However, it was not because they were organized. They were born by themselves, and hardware manufacturers didn't touch them. When we developed the PC-9800 series, we changed our method to make a conscious effort to grow them up". PC-98's large software library assured buyers that the machine could be used for all purposes, although most users actually purchased only a few major software.

Ichiran Kou, a computer consultant, pointed out that IBM influenced NEC's strategy. Since 1982, NEC had four personal computer lines, and they covered a wide price range, similar to IBM's mainframe business. However, NEC's computers had poor backward compatibility and as such was criticized by users and software developers. After reforming personal computer lines in 1983, NEC began expanding the PC-9801 series and its number of models exceeded its competitors.

NEC encouraged third-party developers as IBM did for the IBM PC. The basic hardware of PC-98 was also similar to the IBM PC, though it was not IBM compatible. Kou guessed that NEC avoided releasing an IBM compatible PC because the company was proud of developing an original mainframe.

Yasuhiro Uchida, a literature professor, wrote an essay titled "Users chose the most playable PC". He felt the PC-98 was an "ordinary" 16-bit personal computer, but it had plenty of games because it did not deny the playability. He theorized that Fujitsu did not consider the 16-bit personal computer as a game platform, and considered IBM JX handling games to be of minor importance, which made personal computers less attractive. He concluded that the actual value of personal computers must be found by not sellers but consumers.

=== Legacy ===
A writer of the ASCII magazine wrote that the Japanese input method and the Japanese video game industry were significantly developed in the PC-98 era. Because the PC-98 had a kanji character ROM, Japanese applications were developed for it, which influenced Japanese input methods being developed for them; the two built on each other. Software companies that developed games for the PC-98 immediately expanded the video game business on the Famicom platform. He believed most programmers learned computer programming on the PC-98 at that time.

=== Criticism ===
In the late 1980s, competitors accused NEC of monopolizing the Japanese computer market. Takayoshi Shina, a founder of Sord, said, "The Japanese PC market is suffocating because of one company's dominance. There is no freedom. This is why its prices are 3–4 times as expensive as America's. To fulfill the same international price as America's, we really need the era of clone computers." A software company also complained that "although there are few excellent engineers in Japan, the more incompatible machines appear, the more development resources are divided."

Unlike IBM PCs and the Apple II, every Japanese personal computer had a short lifespan; NEC released a new model of the PC-98 every year. When the PC-9801VX01/21/41 models brought a new BASIC interpreter which supported the Enhanced Graphic Charger (EGC) chipset, most commercial software did not use it as they were written in C. Many developers did not follow it because they wanted to make their software less dependent on a specific platform. A software developer said, "Using the special one (EGC) goes against the trend. I don't want to use it if new machines come out so frequently."

== See also ==
- PC-6600 series – Personal computers series by NEC

== Footnotes ==
Preceded by PC-8800 series	NEC Personal Computers	Succeeded by PC98-NX series
