= ATOK =

Proprietary Japanese input method editor

- Developer: JustSystems
- Release: 1983
- Stable release: ATOK for Windows (Tech Ver.34) / February 1, 2024
- Operating system: Microsoft Windows, macOS, iOS, and Android
- Type: Input method editor
- License: Trialware
- Website: www.atok.com

ATOK (/ˈeɪtɔːk/; エイトック Japanese pronunciation: [eitokku]) is a Japanese input method editor (IME) produced by JustSystems, a Japanese software company.

ATOK is an IME with roots from KTIS (Kana-Kanji Transfer Input System) and comes with JS-WORD, the Japanese word processor software for PC-100 in 1983, but it now supports a variety of platforms including macOS, Windows, Android, and iOS.

Once ATOK meant Automatic Transfer Of Kana-kanji. Now, it means Advanced Technology Of Kana-kanji Transfer. It is occasionally taken to stand for Awa-TOKushima, site of the headquarters of JustSystems, or Alphabet TO Kanji.

== Functions ==
Functions vary between versions for different platforms, and the following list is not exhaustive.

- Search kanji from phonetic input – both using romaji keyboard and kana keyboard.
- Search kanji by radical.
- Drawing pad for handwriting recognition.
- Reverse retrieval of phonetic input – both to kunyomi and onyomi.
- Text templates for standard phrases, address labels and Japanese emoticons.
- Real time auto-completion of text – both Japanese and English. (Example: type "fun" and you immediately get a list of words starting with "fun": function, fun, fund, funk...).
- Character information, JIS and Unicode codes, pronunciations, related characters.
- Japanese date formats.
- Character palette for input of special symbols, accented Latin, Russian, etc.
- Customizable input keys and keyboard shortcuts for the different functions.

== Versions ==
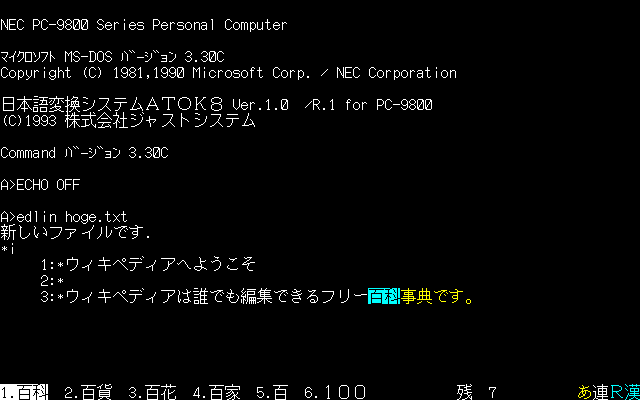
ATOK 8 running in MS-DOS of PC-98 computer

As of April 2019, the latest version for Windows is 31.1.6; for macOS, 31.0.3; for iOS, 1.6.2; and for Android, 1.8.15. They are available via the ATOK Passport subscription and an annual subscription which comes with Ichitaro. Linux, OS/2, Palm OS, Pocket PC, and Windows CE are no longer supported.

KTIS and ATOK was originally a component of JustSystems' word processor software. Ichitaro released in 1985 allowed the use of ATOK 4 in other MS-DOS applications of the PC-98 platform. ATOK 7 was bundled with Ichitaro 4, and was available as a standalone product in 1992. In DOS era, ATOK was spreading with Ichitaro despite competition from VJE, Matsutake, and some other software. Windows 3.1, the first retail version of Japanese Windows, bundled the Microsoft IME (MS-IME) input method. MS-IME 97 contained notable improvements, and was bundled with a new retail box of Windows 95 and Office 97. The difference between ATOK and MS-IME went smaller.

In 2008, JustSystems began a subscription service, ATOK Passport. ATOK 2017 was the last version to be physically shipped as boxed software.

Sun Microsystems chose ATOK as their input method when running under the JP locale in Solaris 10 and above, enhancing Sun's already strong Japanese language support.

For embedded systems, JustSystems has developed +ATOK. Some Japanese mobile phones, PDAs, video game consoles (PSP, PS3 and Wii), digital video recorders, automotive navigation systems come with +ATOK.

== See also ==
- Ichitaro – a Japanese word processor produced by JustSystems. ATOK comes bundled with this.
