= VZ Editor =

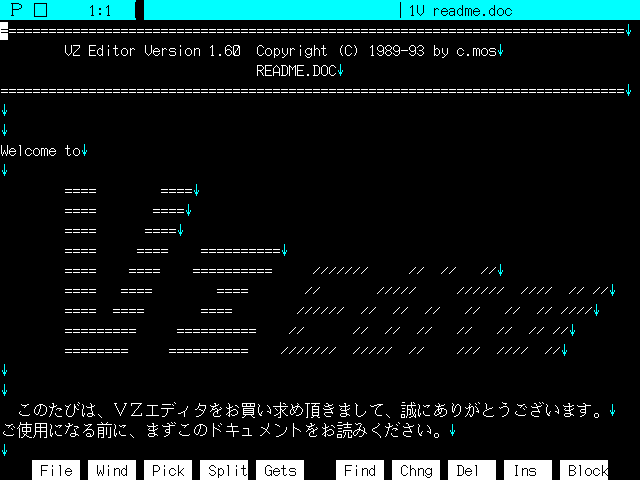
- Developer(s): Yoshihiko Hyōdō (c.mos)
- Initial release: 1987; 38 years ago
- Final release: 1.6 / 15 January 1994; 31 years ago
- Repository: github.com/vcraftjp/VZEditor
- Written in: Assembly language
- Operating system: DOS
- Platform: PC-98, AX, DOS/V, IBM PC, J-3100, PS/55
- Available in: Japanese
- Type: Text editor, File manager
- License: Proprietary 3-clause BSD for version 1.6

VZ Editor (VZ, English: /ˌviːˈzɛd/ or /ˈviːzi/, also US: /ˌviːˈziː/) is a proprietary text editor developed by a computer programmer Yoshihiko Hyodo (兵藤 嘉彦, Hyōdō Yoshihiko) for DOS. It was initially developed for the Japanese PC-98 computer series, and published as EZ Editor (EZ(イーズィ)エディター, Īzi Editā; English: /ˈiːzi/, also US: /ˌiːˈziː/) by PC World Japan in 1987. It was rebranded as VZ Editor by Village Center, Inc, in 1989, and added support for other Japanese computer platforms. Its features include small size, smooth scrolling, file manager, enhancements for a command-line, advanced customizing and automated macro operations.

== History ==
In 1984, Hyodo went work for Hitachi after graduating the Nagoya Institute of Technology, and developed a text editor for the Hitachi S1 personal computer. In 1985, he purchased the NEC PC-9801 U2, and developed a text editor for himself to write programs on that machine. After Hitachi dissolved the development team of S1, Hyodo left the company, and worked for video game development. In 1987, he released his text editor as EZ Editor which was sold by a computer magazine publisher, PC World Japan. In 1989, the publisher faced financial problems, so Hyodo requested another publishing company, Village Center, to distribute his software.

VZ Editor offered a reasonable price in comparison with other commercial software. It priced at 9,800 yen while the biggest competitor, MIFES, priced at 38,000 yen. ASCII magazine wrote in 1991 that "Its TSR mode and file manager are useful. Also, its operability and functions are refined". VZ Editor was entirely written in assembly language because Hyodo was used to writing in assembly language rather than C language. This enhanced speed of program operations. He stated it was not his intention but an inevitable result of minimal coding.

VZ Editor sold 175,000 copies by 1992. It was voted the best PC software in Japanese computer magazines, ASCII (Best 5 Software Recommended by Subscribers; 1992 and 1993) and Nikkei Byte (The Best Utility Software; 1991 and 1992, The Best Editor Software; 1993 and 1994).

Despite its popularity, Hyodo stated in 1993 that he wouldn't offer a new major version nor a Windows version. If the program size become bigger, the macro buffer become smaller, and existing macros cannot run. He concluded there was no way to add a new function. Also, he stated "Anyone casually say they want the Windows version of VZ, but I never plan to bring VZ to Windows. To achieve it, I think it should break its past. VZ is designed for DOS". In January 1994, the last version of VZ Editor was released. He stated in an interview that "The development of VZ has already become my past job. If I create a new software in the future, I need to learn Windows and C++. At present, I don't have the energy to do that".

On November 26, 2024, Hyodo made the source code of VZ Editor version 1.6 available to public under the 3-clause BSD license.
