= NEC PC-100 =

Japanese home computer from 1983

PC-100
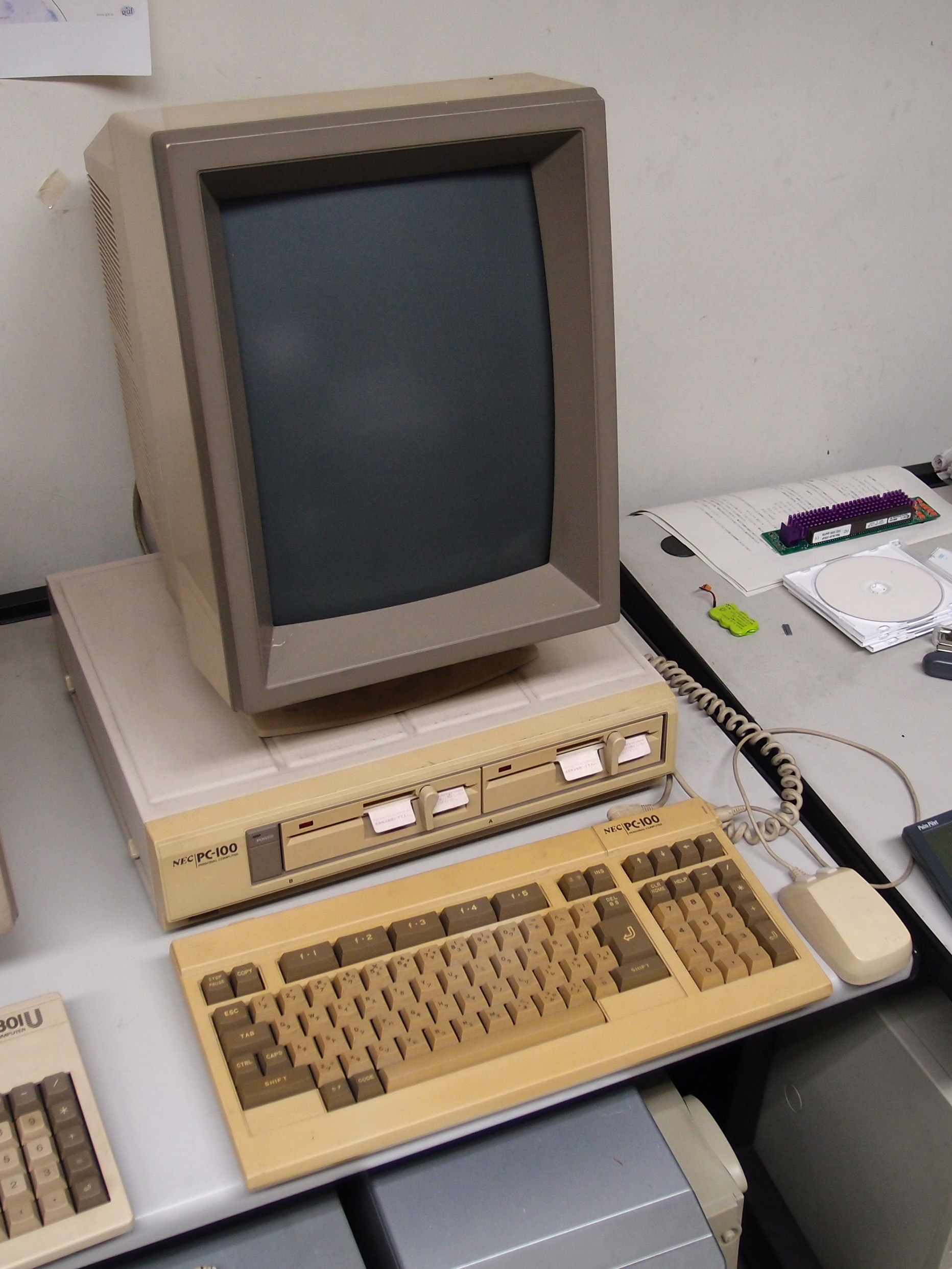
- Developer: NEC, ASCII, Cybernet Kogyo
- Type: Home computer
- Released: October 13, 1983; 42 years ago
- Introductory price: Monochrome US$2,500; Color US$3,300
- CPU: 8086 CPU @ 7 MHz
- Memory: 128 KB RAM (expandable to 768 KB RAM), 32 KB ROM
- Display: 14-inch color CRT (PC-KC651)(Rotatable monitor)
- Graphics: 720 by 512 pixels (512-color palette, capable of displaying 16 colors at once)

The NEC PC-100 was a Japanese home computer available on October 13, 1983. It operated on 8086 CPU 7 MHz, 128 KB RAM, 128 KB VRAM, a Japanese language capable keyboard and a two-button mouse. It had three models and its color monitor, PC-KD651, which could either be used vertically or horizontally, had a price tag of ¥198,000. Its biggest advantage over many other computers of its time was its high graphical resolution of 720 x 512 pixels, with a selection of 16 colors out of a total palette of 512 colors on its high end model30. Its OS was MS-DOS and was also equipped with a spreadsheet program Maruchipuran (Multiplan) and a text editor JS-WORD as well as the game Lode Runner.

The development was operated by NEC Electronic Device Business Group, ASCII (Microsoft dealer in Japan) and Cybernet Kogyo, a subsidiary of Kyocera.

Far ahead of its time and too costly, PC-100 did not sell well. A complete set with the printer PC-PR201 that could print alphabet, hiragana, katakana and kanji, came to nearly ¥1 million. For comparison, the Nintendo Family Computer released in July of the same year was only ¥14,800 and the vaunted Apple Lisa 2 sold for ¥2.2 million. The cheaper PC-9801F2 also by NEC outsold it.

- model10 (¥398,000) - a 5-inch 2D (360 KB) floppy disk drive
- model20 (¥448,000) - two 5-inch 2D floppy disk drives
- model30 (¥558,000) - two 5-inch 2D floppy disk drives

== Competition with PC-98 ==
NEC phased out the PC-100 due to reorganization of its business units rather than its technical issues.

The Electronic Device Business Group launched the PC-8001 in 1979, making NEC the biggest PC vendor in Japan. However, the Japanese personal computer industry had just begun, and it was unclear which market would grow. Other large computer manufacturers, IBM Japan and Fujitsu, had not focused on the personal computer industry yet. Hitachi and Sharp released home computers for hobbyists. Sord and Oki Electric Industry released personal computers for small-business sector.

In 1981, NEC expanded personal computer lines into three groups: NEC Home Electronics, Information Processing Business Group and Electronic Device Business Group, with each specializing in a particular series. The Electronic Device Business Group developed the PC-8801 for consumers who wanted to use it for both hobby and business. The Information Processing Business Group began developing the PC-9801 specialized for business market.

By 1983, the Japanese personal computer industry grew greatly, and its distribution network became complex. It caused the problem for NEC that each group competed to sell its own product to the same chain. Their biggest competitor was each group in the company, and they contested for the leadership. One software company's president recalled the sales section of PC-9801 often said "Down with the 88!".

The PC-100 and PC-9801F were released at the same time, and the problem surfaced. A store manager complained he couldn't determine which salesperson to follow. In December 1983, NEC decided to consolidate personal computer business into two divisions: NEC Home Electronics to oversee the 8-bit home computer line, and Nippon Electric's Information Processing Business Group to handle the 16-bit personal computer line. The Electronic Device Business Group passed off their personal computer business to NEC Home Electronics. NEC Home Electronics discontinued development of the PC-100, PC-6000 series, PC-6600 series and PC-8000 series, and these lines were merged into the PC-8800 series to concentrate on the home computer market.
