= Fujitsu ARROWS A 101F =

Mobile phone

ARROWS A SoftBank 101F
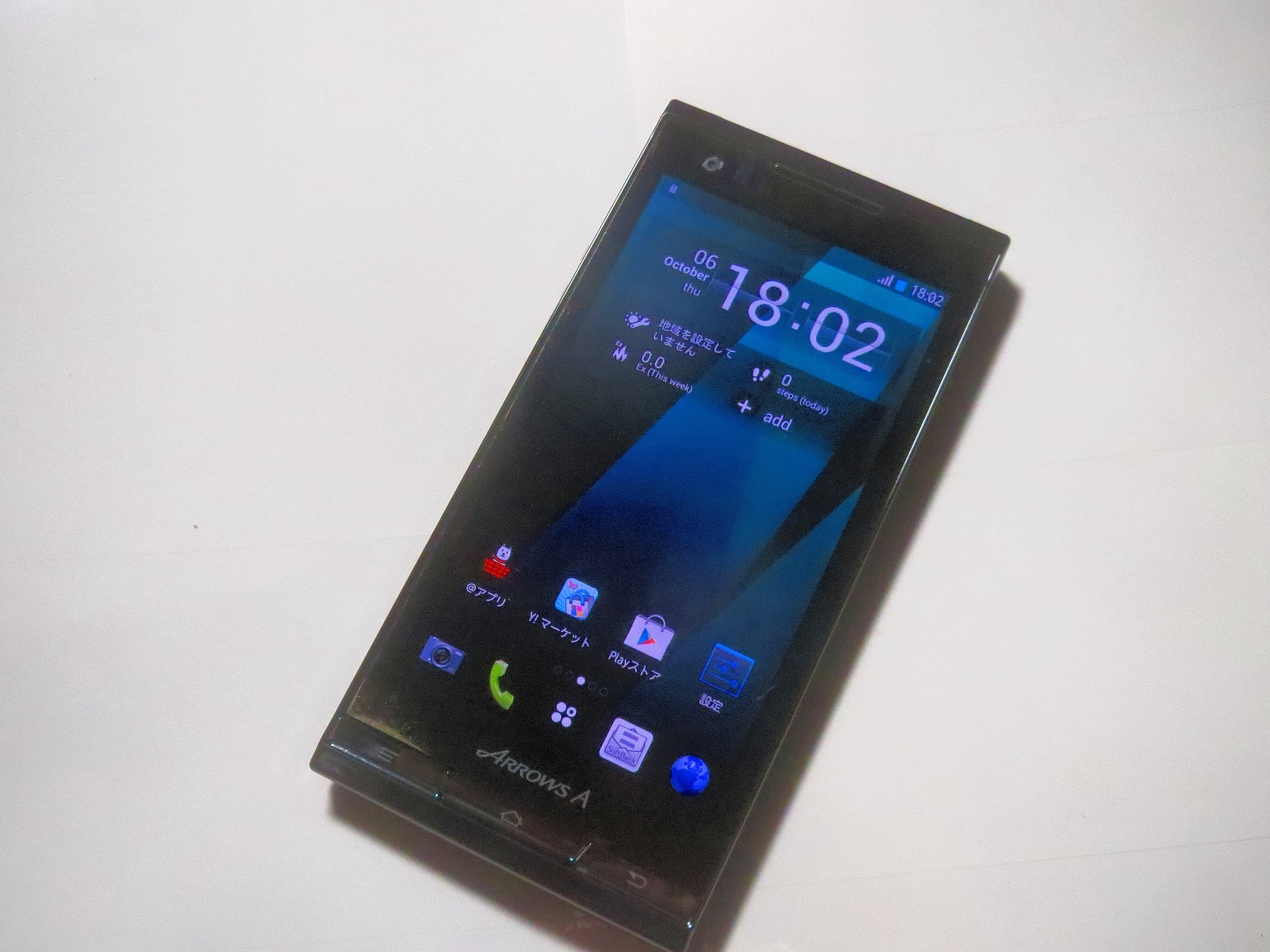
- ARROWS A SoftBank 101F in Black
- Brand: Fujitsu
- Manufacturer: Fujitsu Mobile Communications
- Type: Smartphone
- Series: ARROWS
- Family: SoftBank Smartphone
- First released: July 28, 2012; 14 years ago
- Predecessor: SoftBank X02T
- Successor: SoftBank 201F
- Compatible networks: SoftBank 3G (W-CDMA / 900 MHz "Platinum Band"), GSM
- Form factor: Slate
- Colors: Cyan; Magenta; Black
- Dimensions: 130 mm (5.1 in) H 64 mm (2.5 in) W 9.9 mm (0.39 in) D
- Weight: 138 g (4.9 oz)
- Operating system: Android 4.0, upgradable to Android 4.1
- System-on-chip: Qualcomm Snapdragon S4 Plus MSM8960
- CPU: 1.5 GHz dual-core
- GPU: Adreno 225
- Memory: 1 GB RAM
- Storage: 8 GB ROM
- Removable storage: microSD (up to 2 GB), microSDHC (up to 32 GB)
- Battery: 1800 mAh
- Rear camera: 13.1 MP back-illuminated CMOS (Exmor R for mobile), AF, image stabilization (still photos only), continuous shooting, Full HD video recording
- Front camera: 1.32 MP CMOS
- Display: 4.3 in (110 mm) qHD (540×960 pixels) NEW AMOLED plus, 16.77M colors
- Water resistance: Waterproof / Dustproof
- Model: 101F

The ARROWS A 101F is a 3G smartphone developed by Fujitsu Mobile Communications for SoftBank Mobile's SoftBank 3G network, forming part of the SoftBank Smartphone line. It initially launched running Android 4.0.

Under the Fujitsu brand, this model marked the company's re-entry into the SoftBank lineup after a 14-year hiatus dating back to the DP-125 during the Digital Phone era, making it Fujitsu's first smartphone for SoftBank. Accounting for the history of Fujitsu Mobile's predecessor—the Mobile Communications Division of Toshiba—it was the brand's first handset for SoftBank in approximately two and a half years following the release of the SoftBank X02T in December 2009.

The device is based on the NTT Docomo REGZA Phone T-02D (developed by Fujitsu REGZA), sharing nearly identical exterior design and hardware specifications. However, the 101F supports SoftBank's 900 MHz "Platinum Band" and the ULTRA SPEED service. Its marketing catchphrase was "ULTRA SPEED 42Mbps Compatible: Ultra Image Beauty and a New Operating Experience."

== History ==
- May 29, 2012: Officially announced by SoftBank Mobile.
- July 28, 2012: Released to the market.
- August 17, 2012: Received a software update fixing rare issues with spontaneous resets or power shut-offs and improving fingerprint authentication accuracy. Over-the-air distribution ended on March 31, 2017.

== Specifications ==
=== Hardware ===
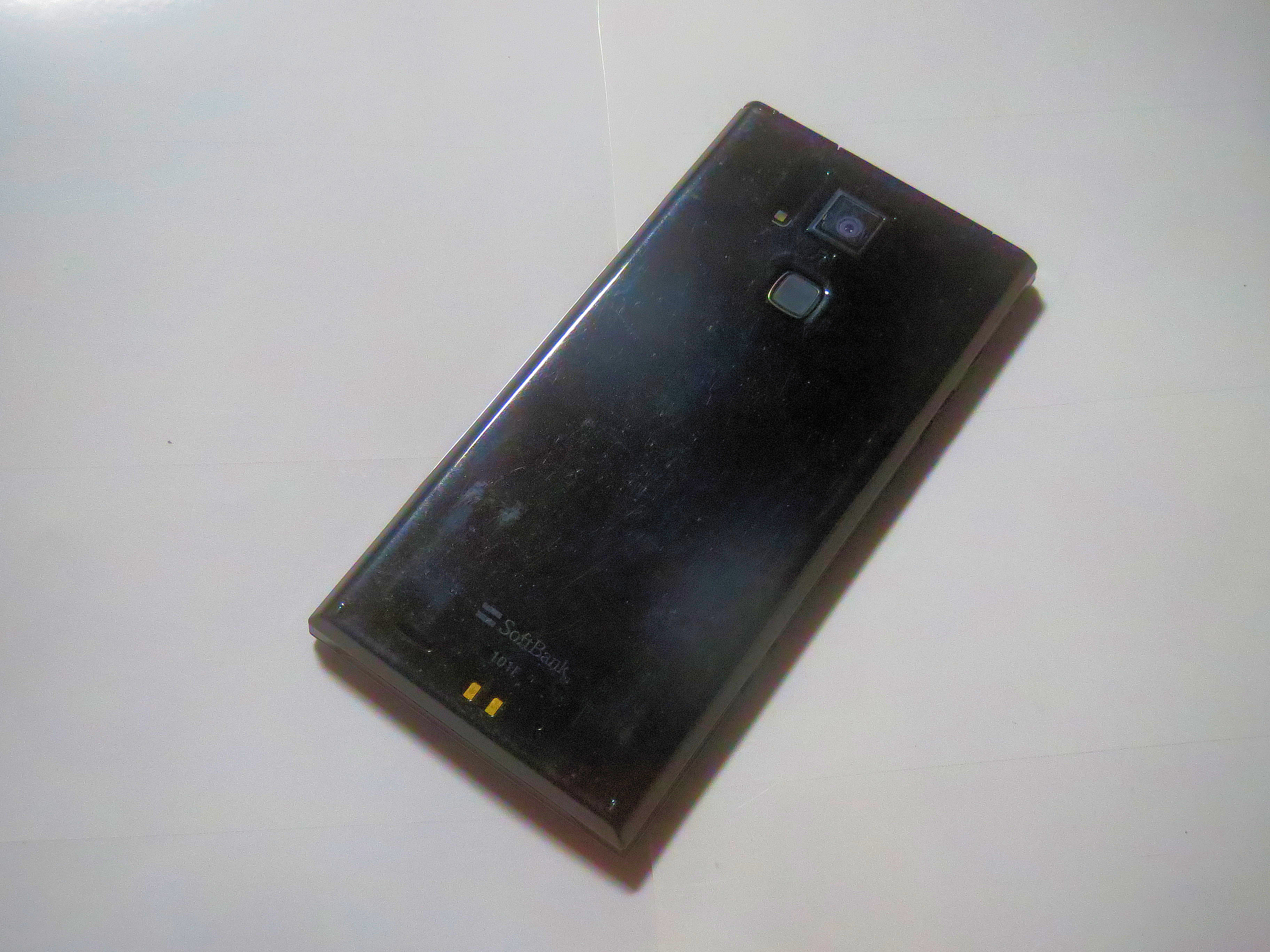
Back panel

The device features a 4.3-inch qHD NEW AMOLED plus display with 16.77 million colors, covered by Corning Gorilla Glass for added durability. Powered by a 1.5 GHz dual-core Qualcomm Snapdragon S4 Plus (MSM8960) processor, it includes 1 GB of RAM and 8 GB of internal ROM, expandable up to 32 GB via microSDHC cards. Its rear primary camera uses a 13.1-megapixel back-illuminated Exmor R for mobile CMOS sensor capable of Full HD video recording and image stabilization, while the front camera utilizes a 1.32-megapixel CMOS sensor. The unit is powered by an 1800 mAh battery, weighs approximately 138 grams, and features an integrated fingerprint sensor, high-sensitivity touch controls, and waterproof/dustproof construction. Additional hardware features include support for Osaifu-Keitai (FeliCa), IrSimple infrared transmission, Bluetooth 4.0+EDR, and USB Mass Storage Class support (FAT32). Network connectivity supports ULTRA SPEED downlink speeds up to 42 Mbps and uplink speeds up to 5.76 Mbps over W-CDMA (900 MHz) and GSM networks, alongside dual-band Wi-Fi (802.11a/b/g/n).

=== Software ===
The smartphone launched with Android 4.0 Ice Cream Sandwich and was later updated to Android 4.1 Jelly Bean. Its pre-installed application suite includes standard Google service integrations (Gmail, Google+, YouTube, Maps, Latitude, Play Store, Play Movies, and Play Music), Japanese text input via ATOK with handwriting recognition support, and built-in digital utility apps such as a document viewer, dictionary plus, temperature and humidity checker, health diary, and DTCP-IP compliant DLNA media playback via DiXiM. Carrier- and vendor-specific features include SoftBank Mail, Osaifu-Keitai payment integration, WAON support, 1Seg TV viewing capabilities, G-Guide program guide, Internet SagiWall security, Virus Scan, NX! Eco power management, and proprietary privacy and app battery diagnostic tools.

== Known Issues ==
In rare circumstances, early software builds experienced spontaneous system resets or sudden power loss. Fujitsu issued a software update on August 17, 2012, to resolve these power instabilities and enhance the accuracy of the fingerprint sensor. OTA distribution of software updates ended on March 31, 2017, requiring subsequent updates to be handled directly through SoftBank service centers.
