= Lode Runner 2 =

1998 video game

- Developer: Presage Software
- Publishers: GT Interactive (Windows); MacSoft (Mac OS)
- Designers: Andrew Howat; Scott Mathews
- Platforms: Mac OS, Windows
- Release: October 27, 1998 (Mac OS); October 2, 1998 (Windows)
- Genre: Puzzle-platform
- Modes: Single-player, multiplayer

Lode Runner 2 is a puzzle-platform game released in 1998 for Mac OS and Microsoft Windows. It is a sequel to Lode Runner and its remakes. Like the earlier Lode Runner's Rescue, Lode Runner 2 has isometric-perspective 2D graphics. It was developed by Presage Software and distributed by GT Interactive for Microsoft Windows and MacSoft for the Macintosh.

== Gameplay ==
The player guides a character through maze‑like structures of bricks, ladders, rails, and ground to collect scattered gold while being chased by monks. The character cannot fight the monks but can dig holes to escape or trap them, with restrictions such as being unable to dig directly beneath themselves or drop into a one‑square‑wide space. Each level ends once all gold is gathered and the exit is reached before the monks catch the character. Lode Runner 2 includes bombs and numerous power‑ups, including temporary disguises, a brick‑morph ability, and other items that influence movement and puzzle solutions. Bombs come in several blast patterns and can destroy diggable bricks, monks, or the character when required. Levels also feature trip wires, triggers, and other mechanisms that increase complexity. The added third dimension affects navigation—force fields can block seemingly open paths, and jumps are limited to corners. The game also includes multiplayer modes and a level editor.

== Development ==
The game uses a distant perspective so as to minimize scrolling. Initially the developers were using a more conventional perspective, but while playing the game they found they were frustrated by their inability to see key elements that were not immediately at hand.

The game was announced in April 1998. Lode Runner creator Doug Smith retained co-ownership of the Lode Runner intellectual property, and served as a consultant and level designer on Lode Runner 2.

== Reception ==
Reception

Review scores
Publication	Score
Inside Mac Games	4/5
Macworld	3/5
MacHome Journal	4.5/5

Macworld's Michael Gowan wrote that Lode Runner 2 "lacks the original game's most attractive feature: simplicity. The 3-D perspective requires that you move diagonally rather than left and right, which can be confounding".
