= Lode Runner =

1983 video game

- VIC-20 cover art
- Developers: Doug Smith; Irem (arcade); Hudson Soft (NES)
- Publishers: Broderbund (US); Ariolasoft; SystemSoft (PC-88); Irem (arcade)
- Programmer: Shinichi Nakamoto (NES)
- Composer: Isamu Hirano (NES)
- Series: Lode Runner
- Platform: Apple II: Atari 8-bit, Commodore 64, VIC-20, FM-7, FM16β, Hitachi S1, IBM PC, IBM JX, arcade, PC-100, PC-6001mkII, PC-8001mkII, PC-88, PC-98, SG-1000, NES, ZX Spectrum, MSX, Sharp MZ, Atari ST, PC Engine, Xbox 360, Windows, iPod, Classic Mac OS, PlayStation 3, BBC Micro, PlayStation, SMC-777, Amstrad CPC, Game Boy, Sharp X1
- Release: June 23, 1983: Apple II; NA: June 23, 1983 Atari 8-bit, C64; October 1983 VIC-20; November 1983 PC-88; JP: December 1983 Arcade; JP: July 1984; EU: October 1984; NA: November 1984 NES; JP: July 20, 1984; NA: September 1987 SG-1000; JP: September 1984; NZ: January 1985 Macintosh; January 1985
- Genre: Puzzle-platform
- Mode: Single-player

Lode Runner is a puzzle-platform game developed by Doug Smith and published by Broderbund in 1983. Its gameplay mechanics are similar to Space Panic from 1980. The player controls a character who must collect all the gold pieces in a level and reach the end while being chased by a number of enemies. It is one of the first games to include a level editor.

After the original game, a number of remakes, spinoffs, and sequels were published in the Lode Runner series for different computers and consoles by different developers and publishers. Tozai Games holds the copyright and trademark rights.

== Gameplay ==
The player controls a human, described as a "Galactic Commando" in the game's manual, who must collect all the gold in a level while avoiding the guards. After collecting all the gold, the player must reach the top of the screen to advance to the next level. There are 150 levels in total, which progressively challenge players' problem-solving abilities or reaction times.

Levels have a multi-story, brick platform motif, with ladders and suspended hand-to-hand bars that offer multiple ways to travel. Guards can pick up gold bars by running over them, but any individual guard cannot carry more than one bar at a time. The player can dig holes into floors to temporarily trap guards and may safely walk over them. If a guard is carrying a bar of gold when he falls into a hole, he will drop it and the player can then pick it up. Holes dug by the player fill in after a short delay. A trapped guard who cannot escape a hole before it fills is consumed and immediately respawns in a random location at the top of the level. Unlike guards, the player's character may not climb out of a hole, and will be killed if it fills before he can escape. Floors may contain trapdoors, through which the player and guards will fall, and bedrock, through which the player cannot dig.

The player can dig a hole only on adjacent sides and may not dig directly beneath. In order to dig through multiple layers of bricks, the player must create a gap whose width is at least equal to the number of layers. However, exceptions to this rule arise when the player digs from the position of standing on a ladder, or hanging from a hand-to-hand bar, which makes it possible to repeatedly dig and descend one row. This kind of digging is involved in solving many of the levels.

The player starts with five lives; each level completion awards an extra life. If a guard catches the player, one life is subtracted, and the current level restarts. The player's character can fall from arbitrary heights without any injury, but cannot jump. The player can also trap themselves in pits from which the only escape is to abort the level, costing a life.

=== Enemy AI ===
While the player's character's position changes, enemies tend to move alternatively.

The guards do not always take the shortest path to the player and can move in counterintuitive ways. For example, when the player and a guard are on the same ladder, the guard will sometimes move away. In general, depending on their exact positioning relative to Lode Runner, the guards sometimes appear to be repelled. Mastering the game involves developing the intuition to predict the movement of the guards.

=== Permitted contact ===
The player may come into contact with a guard directly from above, where the hero's feet touches the guard's head. This is what enables the player to walk over guards that are temporarily stuck in a hole which has been dug. It is also possible to make this contact while both the guard and the player are falling. This is because the player not only runs faster, but also falls faster. Moreover, it is possible to survive the feet-to-head contact while a guard is standing on a platform and begins to move. Both forms of contact are necessary to solve some levels. It is sometimes necessary to liberate a trapped guard by digging while standing on his head, but then moving rapidly in the opposite direction when the guard begins marching to freedom. In a few levels, it is necessary to use a falling guard as a bridge to reach an otherwise unreachable area. One subtlety is that if a down movement is initiated while standing on a guard's head, or briefly touching the guard's head during free fall, the consequences are fatal.

=== Trapping and using guards ===
In some levels, guards can be deliberately trapped in various ways. For instance, they can be lured into entering a part of the level from which there is no escape. In some situations, the player can liberate trapped guards by digging them out. In some levels, the player must exploit the guards by letting them collect gold pieces which are positioned such that whoever collects them will become trapped. When the guard collects the gold and becomes trapped, the player can release the guard and then later steal the gold after it has been dropped.

In some levels, there are gold pieces that can only be collected by digging holes to trap and kill the guards. Deceased guards come back to life from locations near the top of the screen, which may allow them to reach parts of the level that cannot be reached by the player.

=== Traversal orders ===
Some levels require careful ordering of traversal, because they are divided into zones connected by passages which are impossible to navigate in the reverse direction. If a gold piece remains in an unreachable zone, the player may have to abort the level, unless there is a way to coax a guard into bringing the gold.

=== Timing ===
Some puzzles in the advanced levels are time-sensitive. The player must dig in order to penetrate the interior of some cavern to collect gold, and quickly return the same way before the digging repairs itself. Other puzzles require deliberate timing among the digging actions because the player must run over previously dug-out tiles that have just repaired themselves, while having enough time to pass through ones which have not yet repaired.

== Development ==
Around late 1980, high school student James Bratsanos heard from a friend about a new arcade video game, Space Panic by Universal, that involves climbing platforms and ladders while digging holes to trap monsters. Bratsanos was intrigued by his friend's description of the concept, and he wanted to develop it further. He began writing a Commodore PET program, called Suicide, using simple text-based graphics. Instead of developing enemy movement routines that were dependent on a specific shape of a game level, he developed a universal processing loop that would interpret a level, including the positions of the player and collectibles, and move the enemies according to the dynamically changing situation. Bratsanos cited his lack of programming experience as a reason for choosing this approach. This novel design allowed to create a large number of different levels and apply the same game logic to them.

At the University of Washington in 1981, Bratsanos took Fortran classes and, with fellow student Tracy Steinbeck, began porting Suicide to the university's computers; first to a Prime Computer 550 minicomputer limited to one building on the UW campus, then to VAX minicomputers, which had more terminals available on campus. An architecture student Douglas E. Smith soon joined their effort. The game was renamed Kong following the release of Nintendo's arcade platformer Donkey Kong that year, and evolved the concepts of Suicide while still using ASCII character graphics. The group continued to develop Kong over the Summer of 1982, adjusting the gameplay based on feedback from fellow students who played the game on campus. The game was programmed in Fortran and Pascal with sections in assembly language.

Following requests of his nephew, Smith recreated a crude, playable version of Kong in 6502 assembly language on an Apple II Plus over one weekend in 1982, and renamed the game Miner. Through the end of the year, he refined that version, which was black-and-white with no joystick support. Bratsanos, who chose to continue pursuing his studies, was paid $1500 by Smith for the rights to his work, and abandoned the project. Smith submitted a rough version to Broderbund around October 1982 and received a short rejection letter which said "Thank you for submitting your game concept. Unfortunately, it does not fit within our product line." Smith borrowed money to purchase a color monitor and joystick and continued to improve the game. Around Christmas of 1982, he submitted the game once more to four publishers and received offers from all four: Sierra, Sirius, Synergistic, and Broderbund. He took the deal with Broderbund, who chose the name Lode Runner for the game.

Like its text-based Kong predecessors, the submitted game had only simple animation where characters move across the screen in block increments. It was too primitive for an acceptable commercial product as Broderbund wanted detailed pixel-level movement. Smith was given a $10,000 advance by Broderbund to develop the inter-square animation and to provide 150 levels of play. Smith was unable to create all the levels by himself, so he created a level editor for the game and enlisted help of friends and neighbours to design them. The published game would retain this level editor, becoming one of the first to allow players to extend the gameplay with their own content. In a 2010 interview, game designer John Romero claimed that it was the neighborhood kids' desire to create levels which actually inspired Smith to add the level-editing function.

== Release and ports ==
Lode Runner was originally released on June 23, 1983. The original microcomputer versions were for the Apple II, Atari 8-bit computers, VIC-20, Commodore 64, and IBM PC compatibles. The VIC-20 version was released on cartridge, including the level editor. The Commodore 64 had both a disk and cartridge release, with the latter having 32 levels. The IBM PC port was originally on a self-booting disk and is incompatible with video cards other than CGA. A 1986 MS-DOS release runs on any video card.

The Famicom version was released by Hudson Soft in 1984 (North American NES release in 1986) and became one of the earliest third-party games made for that system. It has 50 levels, scrolling screens, added music, and graphics redone in a more cartoon-like style. In addition, fruits and vegetables randomly appear which may be picked up for additional points. A level editor was included, which in Japan used the Famicom's Family BASIC tape drive to save one's work. However, as with many US localizations, the NES lacked the tape drive, making it impossible to save levels created on the US release.

An arcade version of Lode Runner was produced by Irem in 1984. It was notably the first time an American computer game was adapted into a Japanese arcade game. It had some added features like the ability to hang off the ends of ladders and improved enemy AI.

A port for the Macintosh 128K followed in January 1985; it runs on machines up to OS 6 and can be used on System 7 with a patch. Other versions include those for the Atari ST, ZX Spectrum, a licensed version for MSX published by ASCII Corporation, SG-1000, Windows 3.1x, and Game Boy.

Broderbund released an enhanced version, Championship Lode Runner, in 1985, with 50 levels and a higher difficulty. The company offered a commemorative certificate to anyone who could submit proof of having beaten the game (and submitted proof of purchase to show that their copy was not pirated). It was ported to the Apple, Atari, C64, MSX, and IBM PC, as well as the NES (although that version did not reach North America).

The Atari 8-bit version of Lode Runner was converted to cartridge and re-released by Atari Corporation in 1987, as one of the series of releases for the Atari XEGS console. This version contains all 150 levels and the level editor, which requires a disk drive.

== Reception ==
Lode Runner was very successful. It was Broderbund's second best-selling Commodore game as of late 1987, and sales had surpassed 300,000 copies by August 1984. It was the top-selling computer game in the United States during 1983. By 1985, the game had sold just as many copies in Japan. As of 1999, Hudson Soft's Famicom (NES) version had sold about 1.5 million cartridges in Japan and all versions of the game had sold over 3 million units worldwide, including more than 2 million sales in Japan alone.

Softline in 1983 praised Lode Runner, calling it "smooth, thoughtful, and quite addictive". The magazine approved of its large number of unique levels, level editor ("the possibilities are astounding"), and emphasis on "wits and strategy" over violence. Computer Gaming World praised Lode Runner's unusually easy-to-use level editor and the strategy necessary for an arcade title, describing it as "one of the few thinking men's arcade games". In August 1984, Computer Gaming World held a contest for the best reader-built level. Praises for the introduction of strategy into the "climbing game" genre and for the intuitive level editor were repeated in Video magazine's review of the game as well as praise for its graphics and animation, with the Apple II version being described as "stand[ing] out far ahead of the pack".

Ahoy! in 1984 called it "a top-notch action game that requires both a quick mind and an agile joystick". With the "easy-to-use game generator", the magazine concluded that "Lode Runner is one of the best games available for the C-64. Unconditionally and wholeheartedly recommended". PC Magazine gave the game 16.25 out of 18 points. The magazine called the game "a tour de force of American ingenuity ... the first release in a long, long time that can honestly bear the title, 'computer game' ... Lode Runner uses the power of the PC to create something much more than a video version of Ping Pong. This game requires thought, too." The magazine praised the IBM PC version's graphics, increasingly difficult level design, and the level editor. The Commodore 64 Home Companion said "there's lots of education hidden in" the level editor, concluding Lode Runner "is one of the first of a new breed of computer game that lets the player be a creator".

By 1985, the game was still selling well. Video magazine reported that it was the 6th best-selling recreational title in March and April of 1985. Zzap!64 called the Commodore 64 version "not one of the most recent games but certainly one of the best ... a classic for a long time to come ... graphically minuscule and aurally crude, the game's sheer addiction kept my eyes propped open until the owls went to bed". In 1986, Ahoy! described the Commodore 64 version's graphics as "sparse, but attractive" with "evocatively animated" characters.

In 1984, Lode Runner was awarded "1984 Computer Game of the Year" at the 5th annual Arkie Awards. Judges praised its "outstanding design", and described it as "fascinating", "irresistible", and as "the thinking player's climbing conquest". Softline readers named Lode Runner the most popular Apple and fourth most-popular Atari program of 1983. In 1993, the Spectrum version of the game was voted number 37 in the Your Sinclair Official Top 100 Games of All Time. GameSpot named Lode Runner as one of the "Greatest Games of All Time". In 1996, Computer Gaming World declared Lode Runner the 80th-best computer game ever released. In 2010, Time rated Lode Runner #1 in "The 10 Greatest Games for the Apple II" list. Game Informer placed the game 52nd on their top 100 video games of all time in 2001.

Orson Scott Card wrote in Compute! in 1989 that its editor was the first game which let him and his family express their creativity through gaming. Tetris designer Alexey Pajitnov stated in 2008 that Lode Runner was his favorite puzzle game for many years.

== Legacy ==
List of Lode Runner games
| Title | Year released | Platforms | Developer(s) | Publisher(s) | Comments |
|---|---|---|---|---|---|
| Lode Runner | 1983 | Apple II, Atari 8-bit, Commodore 64, VIC-20, PC | Douglas E. Smith | Broderbund | The original game published by Broderbund and developed for Apple II. It contained 150 levels and a level editor. |
| Lode Runner | 1984 | Macintosh | Glenn Axworthy | Broderbund | Macintosh port |
| Lode Runner | 1984 | Famicom (1984), NES (1986) | Hudson Soft | Hudson Soft (for Famicom), Broderbund (for NES) | 50 levels, scrolling screens, added music, and graphics redone in a more cartoon-like style. Fruits and vegetables randomly appear which may be grabbed for additional points. Level editor included. |
| Championship Lode Runner | 1984 | Apple II, Commodore 64, VIC-20, ZX Spectrum, Atari 8-bit, SG-1000, MSX, Famicom, NEC PC Series | Broderbund, Compile Corporation (SG-1000 and MSX versions) | Broderbund, Hudson Soft (for Famicom), SEGA (for SG-1000), Sony (for MSX) | A direct sequel with 50 levels edited by fans and intended for expert play. This game was also scheduled to be released in Japan on October 27, 2009 on the Virtual Console. |
| Lode Runner | 1984 | Arcade (Coin-operated JAMMA board) | Irem | Irem | 24 remixed levels from the 150 original 1983 levels, but reduced to fit a smaller grid of 24x15. This was also the first time a game had transitioned from a home entertainment console to coin-operated arcade cabinet. |
| Lode Runner: The Bungeling Strikes Back | 1984 | Arcade (Coin-operated Jamma board) | Irem | Irem | Consisted of 30 levels, with 10 of these based on the original set. |
| Lode Runner II | 1985 | MSX | Douglas E. Smith | Broderbund | MSX version released in 1985 with 50 levels (22 original levels & 28 new levels) |
| Lode Runner: The Golden Labyrinth (Majin No Fukkatsu) | 1985 | Arcade (Coin-operated Jamma board) | Irem | Irem | As with the other Irem arcade versions contained 30 levels based on the original set. |
| Lode Runner's Rescue | 1985 | Atari 8-bit, Commodore 64 | Joshua Scholar | Synapse Software | 3-D sequel with dozens of 3-D perspective levels and screen design editor. Computer Gaming World praised the Atari version's graphics, but asked "How likely is it that a game with girls, mice, cats, and magic mushrooms should be called 'Lode Runner's Rescue'?" It speculated that the publisher put the series name on an unrelated game. |
| Lode Runner: Teikoku Karano Dasshutsu | 1986 | Arcade (Coin-operated Jamma board) | Irem | Irem | As with the other Irem arcade versions contained 30 levels based on the original set. |
| Lode Runner Board Game | 1986 | Board game | Don Carlston, Broderbund | Tsukuda Original | |
| Super Lode Runner | 1987 | Famicom Disk System, MSX | Irem | Irem | |
| Super Lode Runner II | 1987 | Famicom Disk System, MSX | Irem | Irem | |
| Hyper Lode Runner | 1989 | Game Boy | Bandai | Bandai | |
| Lode Runner: The Lost Labyrinth | 1990 | PC Engine | Pack-In-Video | Broderbund | |
| Battle Lode Runner | 1993 | PC Engine (Japan only) | Hudson Soft | Hudson Soft | |
| Lode Runner: The Legend Returns | 1994 | Windows, DOS, Mac OS, Saturn & PSX | Presage | Sierra Online | |
| Lode Runner Twin | 1994 | SNES (Japan only) | T&E Soft | T&E Soft | |
| Lode Runner Online: The Mad Monks' Revenge | 1995 | Windows, Mac OS | Presage | Sierra Online | |
| Lode Runner | 1997 | Handheld dedicated keychain game | XING Entertainment | XING Entertainment | |
| Lode Runner Extra | 1997 | Sega Saturn (Japan only) 1997, PSX 1998 | Game Arts Co. Ltd | PATRA (Sega), Natsume (PSX) | |
| Lode Runner 2 | 1998 | Windows, Mac OS | Presage | GT Interactive & MacSoft | |
| Lode Runner 3-D | 1999 | Nintendo 64 | Big Bang Software | Infogrames (U.S./Europe), Banpresto (Japan) | |
| Power Lode Runner | 1999 | SNES (Japan only) | Atelier Double, Eye On, T&E Soft | Nintendo | |
| Lode Runner: The Dig Fight | 2000 | Coin-operated Arcade (Japan only) | Psikyo | Psikyo | |
| Lode Runner: The Dig Fight Version B | 2000 | Coin-operated Arcade (Japan only) | Psikyo | Psikyo | |
| Lode Runner: WonderSwan | 2000 | WonderSwan (Japan only) | Banpresto | Banpresto | |
| Lode Runner: Domudomu Dan no Yabou | 2000 | Game Boy Color | XING Entertainment | XING Entertainment | |
| Lode Runner: Game Boy Advance | 2002 | Game Boy Advance | Success | Success | |
| Cubic Lode Runner | 2003 | GameCube, PS2 (Japan only) | Hudson Soft | Hudson Soft | |
| Lode Runner Mobile | 2004 | Mobile phone | FT Mobile | Hudson Soft | |
| Lode Runner: Hudson Best Collection, Vol. 2 | 2005 | Game Boy Advance | Hudson Soft | Hudson Soft | |
| Lode Runner DS | 2006 | Nintendo DS | Hudson Soft | Hudson Soft | |
| Lode Runner Deluxe | 2006 | Mobile phone | Hudson Soft | Hudson Soft | |
| Lode Runner | 2007 | Wii VC | Hudson Soft | Hudson Soft | Re-release of Lode Runner NES original & Battle Lode Runner originally for PC Engine. |
| Lode Runner Mobile | 2008 | Mobile phone (Java) | Hudson Soft | Living Mobile | |
| Lode Runner iPod | 2008 | iPod | Hudson Soft | Hudson Soft | Lode Runner was made available for the click-wheel version of Apple's iPod in mid-December 2008 with enhanced, scrolling graphics. It was released by HudsonSoft and contains 130 levels and several tutorial videos. |
| Championship Lode Runner | 2009 | Wii VC | Hudson Soft | Hudson Soft | Re-release of Championship Lode Runner NES original (Japan only) |
| Lode Runner | 2009 | Xbox 360 LIVE Arcade | Tozai Games/Southend Interactive | Tozai Games/Microsoft | |
| Lode Runner X | 2012 | Xperia mobile devices, Android | Tozai Games/Southend Interactive | Tozai Games/Sony Ericsson | |
| Lode Runner Classic | 2012 | Windows Phone 7, Android, iOS | Tozai Games/Studio Voltz | Tozai Games/Microsoft | |
| Lode Runner 1 | 2017 | Android, iOS | devCAT | NEXON Company | Remake of the NES version. Discontinued in 2020. |
| Lode Runner Legacy | 2017 | Windows, MacOS, Linux, Nintendo Switch, PS4 | Tozai Games | Tozai Games | |
| Lode Runner | 2022 | Atari 2600 | Dion Olsthoorn | Tozai Games | |

=== Arcade ===
In 1984, Irem developed an arcade conversion of Lode Runner. It contains 24 remixed levels from the 150 original levels. Irem brought many of its arcade-inspired levels to the Famicom Disk System with the names Super Lode Runner and Super Lode Runner II. In Japan, Game Machine listed Lode Runner on their August 1, 1984 issue as being the most successful table arcade cabinet of the month. The arcade version has numerous sequels, including these:

- Lode Runner: The Bungeling Strikes Back (1984), selecting 30 levels based on the original game developed for the arcade. The gameplay is almost exactly the same (save the addition of a two-player mode) and the only major modification was the graphics and advancement to a 512-color palette. In Japan, Game Machine listed Lode Runner: The Bungeling Strikes Back on their March 1, 1985 issue as the seventh most successful table arcade unit of the month.
- Lode Runner: Majin No Fukkatsu (1985), also known as Lode Runner: The Golden Labyrinth, developed by Irem. In Japan, Game Machine listed it on their December 15, 1985 issue as the top-grossing table arcade unit during that month. It went on to be Japan's ninth highest-grossing table arcade game during the first half of 1986.
- Lode Runner: Teikoku Karano Dasshutsu (1986)
- Lode Runner: The Dig Fight (2000)

=== 1990s ===
- Lode Runner: The Lost Labyrinth, 1990 updated version for the TurboGrafx-16 featuring all 150 levels of the 1983 set.
- Lode Runner: The Legend Returns, a 1994 Sierra incarnation of the original game with enhanced graphics and tools.
- Lode Runner Online: The Mad Monks' Revenge, the 1995 remake which replaced all the elements of the previous games and added online play.
- Lode Runner 2 (1998), a game with isometric 3D gameplay.
- Lode Runner (1998), a compilation game for PlayStation, which includes Lode Runner: The Legend Returns and Lode Runner Extra.
- Lode Runner 3-D (1999) for the Nintendo 64.

Several versions of Lode Runner were not released in the U.S., like Lode Runner Twin and Power Lode Runner (1999, SFC), which vary in gameplay, mostly by adding different characters and scenarios. Another title, Battle Lode Runner, was originally exclusive to Japan, but made available on 23 April 2007 as the first Japan-only game to appear on Nintendo's Virtual Console service. The original Lode Runner followed in June 2007. There is also a Cubic Lode Runner, a 3-D Lode Runner variant released only in Japan for the GameCube and PlayStation 2.

The NES version, developed by Hudson Soft, marked the first appearance of Bombermen as the opposing robots. The end screen to Bomberman for the NES notes that the original White Bomberman has turned human and hints at his appearance in another game, with the Lode Runner behind him. In the Japanese version, the reference is more direct: "Congratulations – Bomber Man becomes Runner – See you again in Lode Runner".

In Japan, the Famicom version of Lode Runner allows editing and creating levels to share with friends using a Famicom Data Recorder.

Hudson Soft released a version of Lode Runner for Nintendo DS in 2006.

An unreleased version of the game for the Atari Lynx was discovered in 2008 on an old Atari Corp. hard drive.

=== 2000s ===
A remake of Lode Runner, developed by Tozai and Southend Interactive, was released on April 22, 2009. The game features revamped 3D graphics, additional modes, cooperative and competitive multiplayer support, six new block types and a level editor, as well as live leaderboards and a timeline of its history.

=== 2010s ===
Lode Runner Classic was made available as an Xbox Live enhanced game for Windows Phone 7 series of phones on July 18, 2012. It features the graphics, gameplay, and 150 levels from the original Lode Runner. Lode Runner Classic was released for iOS and Android phones on January 17, 2013.

Lode Runner 1 is a remake of the original NES game, and has the same mechanic, in brand new 2D graphics. It is different to the other same-year release in the series, Lode Runner Legacy. It was released for free on Android, iPhone and iPad on May 18, 2017. The game was discontinued in 2020 and its servers shut down in 2021, rendering it unplayable due to a mandatory Google account check.

=== 2020s ===
A new Lode Runner game was announced for the Intellivision Amico. It was announced as being made in partnership between Intellivision Entertainment and Tozai Games, however after the sale of the Intellivision IP to Atari in 2024, there has been no news on whether the game has continued or cancelled development.

In 2017 Tozai Games released Lode Runner Legacy which contains several versions of the game; one which stays nearly 100% faithful to the original game in both graphics and sound, others that have newly designed levels, a more cartoonish graphic approach with modern effects and sounds, and one version having co-op gameplay. Tozai has ported the game to several platforms including PS4 and Nintendo Switch.

Dion Olsthoorn licensed the original Lode Runner from Tozai to create a version for the Atari 2600. The ZeroPage Homebrew channel featured the gameplay and an interview with the programmer on their Twitch Livestream on October 8, 2022.

== See also ==
- Mr. Robot and His Robot Factory (1984)
- Ultimate Wizard (1984)
- Ladder (video game) (1982)
