= Championship Lode Runner =

1984 video game

- Famicom cover art
- Developers: Broderbund; Compile (SG-1000, MSX)
- Publishers: Broderbund; Hudson Soft (Famicom); Sega (SG-1000); Sony (MSX)
- Designer: Doug Smith
- Programmers: IBM PC; Doug Greene; Famicom; Shinichi Nakamoto
- Composer: Isamu Hirano (Famicom)
- Series: Lode Runner
- Platforms: Apple II, Atari 8-bit, Commodore 64, IBM PC, Famicom, MSX, SG-1000
- Release: 1984: Apple, C64, IBM PC; 1985: Atari 8-bit, Famicom, SG-1000; 1986: MSX
- Genre: Puzzle-platform
- Mode: Single-player

Championship Lode Runner is a sequel to the 1983 puzzle-platform game Lode Runner. It was released in 1984 for the Apple II, Commodore 64, and IBM PC (as a self-booting disk), then ported to the Atari 8-bit computers, Famicom, SG-1000, and MSX. While very similar to Lode Runner, Championship Lode Runner features levels that are much more difficult. Unlike the original, it does not include a level editor.

== Gameplay ==
Gameplay screenshot

The object of the game is to pick up all the gold pieces (which appear as piles of gold) and get them to the top. Enemies must be overcome using non-violent methods. Bumping into enemies costs the player a life and all of their gold pieces. The game includes 50 levels which must be completed in proper sequential order. While games can be saved, the player automatically loses a life for restoring the game.

Unlike the original Lode Runner game, Championship Lode Runner did not come with a level editor. Many of the levels made for this game were designed using the built-in level editor from the original game.

== Ports ==
The game was first released for the Apple II. The Famicom port of the game was published by Hudson Soft. Famicom players can start at any of the first ten levels while needing passwords to skip to the next levels. The Apple II version and Famicom offered players a certificate for completing the game.

The IBM PC self-booting disk version was written by Doug Greene.

In 1985, Sega published the game for the SG-1000 in Japan and it was released on the My Card format. A port was also released for the MSX. Both versions were developed by Compile.

== Reception ==
Based on sales and market-share data, Video magazine listed the game seventh on its list of best selling video games in February 1985.

Ahoy! in 1986 agreed with the box's warning of Championship Lode Runner's difficulty and advised even expert players to obtain the hint book, because each of the 50 levels would require twice as much time as the original game's most-difficult.
