= Lode Runner (1998 video game) =

1998 puzzle-platform video game

- Developer: Presage Software
- Publisher: Natsume Inc.
- Series: Lode Runner
- Platform: PlayStation
- Release: NA: March 26, 1998
- Genre: Puzzle-platform
- Modes: Single-player, multiplayer

Lode Runner is a video game developed by Presage and published by Natsume Inc. for the PlayStation in 1998. It is a compilation game combining ports of Lode Runner: The Legend Returns (1994) and the Japan-exclusive Lode Runner Extra (1997).

The game received mixed reviews upon release, with critics praising the level editor. The gameplay was also mostly well-received, but reviewers differed in their views on the title's incremental improvements to the Lode Runner series, noting the game's appeal to fans of the series and retro gaming in general.

== Gameplay ==
Lode Runner is a game in which the player moves through 2D levels made of ladders and platforms, collecting coins while avoiding enemies. Progress depends on determining a viable path through each stage rather than on fast reflexes. Movement is handled with the D‑pad, and enemy behavior follows simple patterns that support the puzzle‑focused design. The game also includes a level editor, allowing players to build their own stages using the same elements found in the main game.

== Reception ==
Reception

Review scores
Publication	Score
Electronic Gaming Monthly	6.375/10
IGN	6/10
Next Generation	3/5
Official U.S. PlayStation Magazine	2.5/5
PlayStation: The Official Magazine	2.5/5

The game received mixed reviews. The four reviewers of Electronic Gaming Monthly commented that while it is updated from the original Lode Runner, both the graphics and gameplay are essentially retro. Crispin Boyer and Shawn Smith praised it for staying true to its roots and believed the classic gameplay would appeal to the new generation of gamers, while Kraig Kujawa said that the gameplay did not stand the test of time and Dan Hsu, though he liked both the retention of the original gameplay and the fun two-player mode, said that with flaws such as A.I. glitches and occasionally poor level design, the game is "solid, but a bit odd". Adam Douglas of IGN agreed that the upgrade over the original Lode Runner was extremely modest, but the gameplay holds up well, especially the level creation mode. He recommended the game to those who liked the original game and retro gaming. Next Generation was positive to the compilation, but added that it brings nothing new to the series, and considered that it will attract to those who are new to the franchise. GamePro praised the level creation mode, sharp graphics, ambient music, and controller interface.

PlayStation Magazine thought that some gamers might be turned away by the game's "extremely low-end" graphics and relatively complicated gameplay, but found the latter to be addictive and the game overall suitable for those seeking nostalgia and for competitive multiplayer sessions. Official U.S. PlayStation Magazine similarly found the graphics to be dated, and criticized the game's difficulty, which the reviewer stated was compounded by the PlayStation controller's tendency to drift diagonally. Nonetheless, the magazine praised the introduction, the enemy A.I., and the level editor in addition to an already large set of levels.
