= Battle Lode Runner =

1993 video game

- Developer: Hudson Soft
- Publisher: Hudson Soft
- Director: Mikio Ueyama
- Designers: Keigo Yasuda; Kazutoshi Ueda
- Platforms: PC Engine, Wii (Virtual Console)
- Release: JP: February 10, 1993; Virtual Console: NA: April 23, 2007; PAL: April 27, 2007; JP: May 29, 2007
- Genre: Puzzle-platform
- Modes: Single-player, multiplayer

Battle Lode Runner is a puzzle-platform game based on the Lode Runner series of games, originally released for the NEC PC Engine by Hudson Soft in 1993. It was released in Japan on May 29, 2007 and also released in the North American and European regions for the first time in April the same year for the Wii Virtual Console. It is also the first game originally released only in Japan to be available on the Virtual Console for another region.

== Gameplay ==
Battle Lode Runner's gameplay revolves around traveling through 50 different stages in 11 different time periods, collecting gold without being caught by enemies. The character can climb ropes and ladders, walk on top of enemies, collect power-ups, and most importantly, dig a hole on the right or left of himself.

=== Multiplayer ===
The player can play with 5 players in 3 categories of play: survival, escape, and tag match. In survival the last remaining player wins. In the escape mode, the first person to collect the secret gold, unlock the ladder and escape wins. In tag match, players form teams and attempt to trap the members of the other team.
