= Lode Runner's Rescue =

1985 video game

- Publisher: Synapse Software
- Designer: Joshua Scholar
- Platforms: Commodore 64, Atari 8-bit
- Release: NA: November 1985
- Genre: Action
- Mode: Single-player

Lode Runner's Rescue is a 1985 action game developed by Joshua Scholar for the Commodore 64 and Atari 8-bit computers as a follow-up to Doug Smiths's Lode Runner. Lode Runner was published by Broderbund, but the sequel was published under the Synapse Software name, a company acquired by Broderbund in 1984. Lode Runner's Rescue uses isometric projection to give a 3D feel.

== Reception ==
Lode Runner's Rescue was positively received by the press, including Ahoy!, ANALOG Computing, Atari Explorer, and Commodore Magazine which described it as a surprise hit.

Greg Williams of Computer Gaming World praised the Atari version's graphics but asked "How likely is it that a game with girls, mice, cats, and magic mushrooms should be called Lode Runner's Rescue?" He speculated that the publisher put the series name on an unrelated and independently developed game. Roy Wagner reviewed the Commodore 64 version for Computer Gaming World and praised the ability of creating the player's screens with icon screen editor. Ahoy! stated that the Commodore 64 version's graphics were much better than the earlier games.
