= Lode Runner 3-D =

1999 video game

- North American cover art
- Developer: Big Bang
- Publishers: JP: Banpresto; NA: Infogrames
- Designers: Brett Ballow; Russell Ginns; Michael Harrington
- Composer: Julian Soule
- Series: Lode Runner
- Platform: Nintendo 64
- Release: NA: March 30, 1999; JP: July 30, 1999; PAL: 1999
- Genre: Platform
- Mode: Single-player

Lode Runner 3-D is a Nintendo 64 game in the Lode Runner franchise. The game was developed by Big Bang and was released in 1999 in North America and Europe by Infogrames, and in Japan by Banpresto. It is the first 3D game in the Lode Runner series.

== Gameplay ==
The game mechanics are similar to the original: players must outrun enemies by using alternate routes, sliding on ropes, climbing ladders, or drilling holes in the ground to trap them. This game differs from earlier titles in the series due to its three-dimensional perspective. Although the gameplay largely occurs in two-dimensional space, players occasionally have the option to move in a third direction. The levels are primarily structured as spirals that involve climbing to progress. There are five worlds, each of which must be unlocked by finding five cards in the previous world, excluding the first. Each world is divided into five stages, and each stage is further split into four levels. The main objective of each level is to collect a certain amount of gold to activate a portal, which allows players to proceed. As the game progresses, new worlds introduce additional interactive objects, tools, and obstacles.

== Plot ==
After the events of Jake Peril's previous adventures, he has been living a relatively peaceful life on his home planet with his wife, Jane Peril. However, the Mad Monk Emperor of Planet Pandora finally reveals himself, stealing all of Earth's gold resources. Once again, it falls to Jake Peril to defeat the Mad Monks and, ultimately, their leader.

== Reception ==
Reception

Review scores
Publication	Score
Famitsu	6/10 (Note: In Famitsu's review, two critics scored Lode Runner 3-D 7/10, one 6/10, and another 4/10.)
GamePro	4/5
GameRevolution	C−
GameSpot	6.2/10
Hyper	55/100
IGN	7/10
Jeuxvideo.com	14/20
N64 Magazine	70%
Nintendo Power	7.7/10
Official Nintendo Magazine	84%
Superjuegos	77/100
Video Games (DE)	74%
The Cincinnati Enquirer	2.5/4
Gamers' Republic	B−

The game received average to positive reviews. IGN gave it a score of 7 out of 10, praising the game for successfully taking the original concept and adapting it into a new format that enhances the experience. GameSpot noted that the game was slower and more difficult compared to previous entries in the franchise.
