= Lode Runner: The Legend Returns =

1994 video game

- Developers: Presage Software; Game Arts (Saturn)
- Publisher: Sierra On-Line
- Designer: Jake Hoelter
- Platforms: MS-DOS, Mac OS, PlayStation, Saturn, Windows
- Release: 1994
- Genre: Puzzle-platform
- Modes: Single-player, multiplayer

Lode Runner: The Legend Returns is a 1994 remake of 1982's Lode Runner video game. It was released for Microsoft Windows, Mac OS, Sega Saturn, and Sony PlayStation.

== Gameplay ==
The game takes place in a single frame with many different elements such as ground, ladders, treasure, items, and villains. The goal is to collect all the treasure, avoid touching any of the monks, and reach the exit.

New elements include devices that can be picked up and used only one at a time. These devices include snare traps, incapacitating sprays, jackhammers, two types of bombs, pickaxes (which make a pile of rock from the ceiling blocking enemies from advancing), and buckets filled with goo that is used to cover surfaces and slow characters down.

Screenshot of the player in a level of the 'Moss Caverns' world using their blaster with a mad monk in pursuit

The game also resurrects the original Lode Runner's several varieties of "turf" as well as introducing one more. In addition to the standard turf, which is susceptible to being dug through with the player's blaster, there are also the nostalgic bedrock (which can only be penetrated with a jackhammer or a larger bomb that, unlike small bombs, permanently destroyed turf or any other item in the level except the exit) and trapdoor turf, which resembles regular turf but which actually is empty space. Another form of turf is introduced: gooey turf, which slows the passage of both the player and his enemies.

The game contains 150 single-player levels broken up into ten different "worlds": Moss Caverns (jungle), Fungus Delvings, the Lost City of Ur (ancient world), the Crystal Hoard, Winter's Dungeon (ice world), Skeleton's Keep (fossil world), Inferno's Playground (lava world), Shimmering Caverns (phosphorus world), the Shadowlands (dark world), and Meltdown Metropolis (industrial world). While most levels are set in the day, the levels of Shadowlands take place at night, when the entire screen is pitch black, save a moving circular patch of light within which the player is visible. There are also 30 duo-player levels. The two Shadowlands levels in this mode are not pitch black.

A level editor is included with the game, allowing several levels to constitute a single group of levels, as well as the ability to switch between different tile sets. The editor can choose to set the level in night or day, as well as change the background music regardless of the tile set.

== Plot ==
The player character is named Jake Peril and wears a gray suit, although a second player can play as his partner, Wes Reckless (who wears a blue suit), during two-player cooperative levels and head-to-head hotseat play. The robots of the original game are skeletal "mad monks" who wear red robes. The game's manual explains that Jake, and optionally Wes, travel to unknown underground worlds in the hopes of scavenging the untold golden treasures that litter the game's levels. At the end of the game, Jake is seen in the Technological world calling an elevator to the surface, eagerly waiting while the credits roll. The elevator arrives but malfunctions, leaving Jake no other choice but to reach the surface using the presumably tall staircase.

== Development ==
The Macintosh and Windows versions of the game were developed by Presage Software.

== Reception ==
Pyramid magazine reviewed Lode Runner: The Legend Returns, contrasting it with the original game as "a classic game which was almost instantly addictive" and noting that "The basic premise has not changed: your mission is still to go and swipe all of the goodies from each level without getting torn limb from limb by the Mad Monks (which happens in a delightfully graphic manner in the new version, by the way)."

A reviewer for Next Generation gave the PC version two out of five stars, saying that though the new graphics, soundtrack, and sound effects are all pleasing, the gameplay is not different enough from that of the original Lode Runner to interest players looking for something new.

Next Generation reviewed the Macintosh version of the game, rating it four stars out of five.

Lode Runner: The Legend Returns won the 1994 Game of the Year award from Games Magazine in the "Best New Arcade Game" category.

The editors of PC Gamer US nominated The Legend Returns for their 1994 "Best Puzzle Game" award, although it lost to Goblins Quest 3.

== Legacy ==
One year after its release, Sierra released Lode Runner Online: The Mad Monks' Revenge, which fixed many of the bugs and added additional gameplay features.

In 1998, Natsume Inc. packaged Lode Runner: The Legend Returns with Lode Runner Extra as Lode Runner, a 2-in-1 game for the PlayStation. The game included a video introduction by the game's creator Doug Smith explaining how Lode Runner came about.
