= Hyper Lode Runner =

1989 video game

- North American box art
- Developer: Tose
- Publisher: Bandai
- Series: Lode Runner
- Platform: Game Boy
- Release: JP: September 21, 1989; NA: February 1990
- Genres: Platform, puzzle
- Modes: Single-player, multiplayer

Hyper Lode Runner is a video game for the Game Boy from Bandai released in 1989 in Japan and 1990 in North America. It is based on the 1983 game Lode Runner from Broderbund. While each level in the original fit on a single screen, Hyper Lode Runner has a scrolling playfield.

== Reception ==
Reception

Review scores
Publication	Score
Electronic Gaming Monthly	3/10, 3/10, 4/10, 3/10
Nintendo Life	6/10
Total!	84%

Hyper Lode Runner received mixed reviews upon release. Total! described the game as the "toughest [Game Boy] cart to date by far", citing frustrations with its "incredibly hard" difficulty. Despite noting the game's "decent gameplay" and the inclusion of an edit mode, Electronic Gaming Monthly found Hyper Lode Runner to offer little enjoyment as an unremarkable port of the original title. In a retrospective review, Dave Frear of Nintendo Life described the game as "enjoyable" but critiqued the game's "off-putting" difficulty, expressing disappointment with the lack of a save function for the level editor.
