= Yellow paint in video games =

Video game design concept

Example of yellow paint used in a level to indicate direction, interactable props and climbable ledges

In video game design, yellow paint (also the subject of the yellow paint debate or discourse) is the use of clearly visible markers in level design to hint to players where to go or what to do, specifically yellow paint, a technique utilized by numerous games. Yellow paint has the benefit of being highly visible, but the downside that players may find it immersion-breaking. Its use has also drawn controversy for accommodating novices, who may be worse at navigating the game world or noticing details of the environment, at the expense of lowering the difficulty or being patronizing for more skilled players. The backlash against forced yellow paint has caused yellow paint removal mods to be developed by fans for games that utilize it.

== Description ==
Bright colors are attention-grabbing, something encountered in nature through warning coloration and in everyday human life in the colors used for warning indicators, such as safety yellow. In video games, the game environment represents a simulacrum of some real space, in which player movement and environmental interaction are usually limited compared to real life. As players may miss realistic cues on where a path is, or which items will respond to interaction attempts, game developers may choose to use brightly colored indicators to draw the player's attention.

The amount of detail in video game levels has gone up as the underlying technology improves, and this makes some historical solutions, such as unique art assets for climbing points, less obvious than they were in older games. If the path forward is sufficiently unintuitive – a subjective problem discovered either by playtesters or the community that plays the game after its release – it can leave players stuck, in some cases causing them to give up on the game entirely. The use of in-world markers guiding the player's direction, typified by (but not limited to) yellow paint, represents an attempt by the game developers to provide guidance without breaking the game's sense of immersion. The debate around yellow paint is over the extent to which this practice is necessary and effective.

== History ==
IGN's Vikki Blake cites Uncharted as an early example of yellow paint guide markers in games. The Stanley Parable, a satirical game from 2013, features an extreme form of yellow paint guidance in which the player is instructed by the game's narrator to follow a yellow stripe on the floor. More recent games involved in the debate include the Resident Evil 4 remake and Final Fantasy VII Rebirth.

== Reception ==
Games journalist Celia Wagar described yellow paint as "a cheap and easy way of" indicating interaction points, "but it probably represents an earlier failure in the art design of the game". PlaytestCloud wrote that "It's hard to say whether or not the use of yellow paint is the right solution, as we’d argue it all depends on the type of experience the developers are trying to create... Nevertheless, it's hard to disagree that the yellow paint can sometimes be intrusive, leading us to believe that game developers could devise an alternative." More recent reception of yellow paint from players is strongly negative, as evidenced by the mixed reactions to Marvel's Wolverine, which features heavy use of "yellow paint" and other forms of visual cue level design.

In a 2024 article, Kotaku summed up the yellow paint debate as unsolvable: "Get rid of it and some games become unplayable for folks. Keep it and people will make fun of it and complain. Add a toggle and then you have to build your levels and art in a way that can guide players without yellow paint for all the folks who turn it off."

Fans of Final Fantasy VII Rebirth released a mod called "No More Yellow Paint", which removes the yellow paint markers from the game, in response to the lack of an in-game setting to toggle it on or off. The mods "Please Shut Up" for God of War Ragnarök and "Shut Up Aloy" for Horizon Forbidden West have been compared to removing yellow paint, due to their silencing of hundreds of voice lines solely intended to provide hints to the player.

== See also ==
- Tutorial (video games)
- Suspension of disbelief
- Ludonarrative dissonance
