= Lode Runner Online: The Mad Monks' Revenge =

1995 video game

- Developer: Presage Software
- Publisher: Sierra On-Line
- Director: Jake Hoelter
- Designers: Todd Daggert; Mick Foley; Jake Hoelter; Craig A. Vinet
- Platforms: Windows, Mac OS
- Release: 1995
- Genre: Puzzle-platform
- Modes: Single-player, multiplayer

Lode Runner Online: The Mad Monks' Revenge (stylized as Lode Runner On-Line) is an enhanced version of the 1994 game Lode Runner: The Legend Returns. The game includes online functionality so that players can battle or work together via network play. Despite the name, the game can be played as single-player and offline.

== Gameplay ==
While maintaining all of the original features of The Legend Returns, Lode Runner Online adds several new features, such as bombs which constantly self-ignite and reappear on a set timer. New available "worlds", which determine background and terrain appearance on a map, are a chief addition. New hazards, such as phase blocks, which disappear and reappear on a set timer (and consequently can tear apart players or monks standing in the location of a vanished block in the process of reappearing), and items are among other additional features; notably, editors can specify certain items to be able to be picked up by only the player of corresponding color (e.g. bombs with blue outlines can only be picked up by the second player, Wes Reckless, not Jake Peril).

The level editor is more complex than in the original game. Multiple exits can be placed in a level, and the exits can be programmed to lead to differing levels in a pack.

== Reception ==
Reception

Review scores
Publication	Score
Albuquerque Journal	5/5
Computer Games Magazine	1/5
Philadelphia Daily News	2.5/4
PC Player	2.5/5
PC Action	75%

Reviews were polarized - Albuquerque Journal said "This is a superb update the entire family will enjoy", and scoring 5/5, whereas Computer Games Magazine said "Overall, this game is an absolute waste for anyone but a puzzle freak. Why spend hours upon hours running around stealing someone's gold for no apparent reason? I don't know, I wouldn't do it" giving the game 1/5.
