= Virtual Console =

Line of downloadable video games for several Nintendo platforms

- Developer: Nintendo
- Type: Classic video game re-release distribution
- Launched: Wii: November 19, 2006; 3DS: June 6, 2011; Wii U: January 23, 2013
- Discontinued: Wii: January 30, 2019; 3DS and Wii U: March 27, 2023
- Platforms: Nintendo 3DS; Wii; Wii U
- Status: Discontinued

The Virtual Console (Note: Virtual Console (バーチャルコンソール, Bācharu Konsōru)) is a discontinued line of downloadable video games for Nintendo's Wii, Nintendo 3DS, and Wii U video game consoles. The Virtual Console game library consisted of games previously released on past consoles and were generally run in their original forms through software emulation and purchased through the Wii Shop Channel or Nintendo eShop.

On Wii and Wii U, the Virtual Console's library of past games consisted of titles originating from the Nintendo Entertainment System (NES), Super Nintendo Entertainment System (SNES), Game Boy, Game Boy Color, Nintendo 64, Game Boy Advance, and Nintendo DS, as well as Sega's Master System, Genesis and Game Gear, NEC's TurboGrafx-16, and SNK's Neo Geo. The service for the Wii also included games for platforms that were sold only in select regions, such as the Commodore 64 (Europe and North America) and Microsoft's and ASCII's MSX (Japan), as well as Virtual Console Arcade, which allowed players to download video arcade games. On the other hand, the Virtual Console on Nintendo 3DS had a smaller library consisting of NES, SNES, Game Boy, Game Boy Color, Game Boy Advance and Game Gear titles.

Launching with the Wii at the end of 2006, Virtual Console titles had been downloaded over ten million times as of early 2008. The distribution of past games through the Virtual Console is one of Nintendo's reasons for opposing software piracy of old console games. On January 30, 2019, the Virtual Console service was discontinued on the Wii, with the closure of the Wii Shop Channel. On March 27, 2023, the Virtual Console service was discontinued on the Wii U and Nintendo 3DS. Purchased titles remain playable.

== Platforms and compatibility ==
As of March 2023, Nintendo has dropped support for purchasing any games through the Virtual Console, though previously purchased games can still be re-downloaded.

Virtual Console
Platform	Wii Shop Channel (discontinued)	Nintendo eShop (discontinued)	
Platform	Wii	Wii U	Nintendo 3DS family
Arcade
Virtual Console Arcade	Yes	Yes (only through "Wii Mode" backwards compatibility)	No
Home systems
NES	Yes	Yes	Yes
SNES	Yes	Yes	Yes (New Nintendo 3DS and New Nintendo 2DS XL models only)
Nintendo 64	Yes	Yes	No
TurboGrafx-16	Yes	Yes	Yes (Japanese 3DS Systems only)
Master System	Yes	Yes (only through "Wii Mode" backwards compatibility)	No
Genesis	Yes	Yes (only through "Wii Mode" backwards compatibility)	No
Neo Geo AES	Yes	Yes (only through "Wii Mode" backwards compatibility)	No
Commodore 64 (North America and PAL regions only)	Yes	Yes (only through "Wii Mode" backwards compatibility)	No
MSX/MSX2 (Japan only)	Yes	Yes	No
Handheld systems
Game Boy	No	No	Yes
Game Boy Color	No	No	Yes
Game Boy Advance	No	Yes	Yes (Limited availability only through the Nintendo 3DS Ambassador Program)
Nintendo DS	No	Yes	No
Game Gear	No	No	Yes

=== Japan ===
There were 38 Famicom, Super Famicom, Nintendo 64, Mega Drive, and PC Engine games available at launch on the Wii Virtual Console for the Japanese region. The Nintendo 3DS Virtual Console launched with 7 Game Boy and Game Boy Color titles. New Virtual Console software is added on Tuesdays (Wii) and Wednesdays (Nintendo 3DS, Wii U) at 2:00 pm JST and there were a total of 659 titles for the Wii, 244 titles for the 3DS (256 for Nintendo 3DS Ambassadors) and 466 titles for the Wii U available.

=== North America ===
There were 12 total NES, SNES, N64, and Genesis games available at launch on the Wii Virtual Console for the North American region. Two TurboGrafx-16 titles were added two days later on November 21, 2006. The Nintendo 3DS Virtual Console launched with 4 Game Boy and Game Boy Color titles. North America saw its first release of Commodore 64 games on the service on February 23, 2009, and its first Virtual Console Arcade games on March 25, 2009. There were 398 titles for the Wii, 172 title for the 3DS (184 including those available for Nintendo 3DS Ambassadors and Donkey Kong: Original Edition) and 267 titles for the Wii U available.

Though the Virtual Console lineup initially only covered games that had been released in North America, George Harrison indicated in an interview that there was a possibility that Nintendo or other Virtual Console providers would localize Japanese games that have never been released in English. This later came to reality, and former Japan-only games have appeared on the North American Virtual Console. The first game to be added with such localization was Sin and Punishment for the Nintendo 64. While other previous Japan-only titles had been released through the Virtual Console prior to this, the first being Battle Lode Runner from the TurboGrafx-16, added on April 23, 2007, this and all others were originally written in English and required no localization. Despite the fact others fit the category, there are currently 25 titles listed under the "Import" genre with 1 removed: Sin and Punishment, Super Mario Bros.: The Lost Levels (previously available in North America as part of Super Mario All-Stars), Ninja JaJaMaru-kun, Alien Soldier (although the game was previously available in North America through the Sega Channel), DoReMi Fantasy: Milon's DokiDoki Adventure, Puyo Puyo 2, Bio Miracle Bokutte Upa, Dig Dug, Gley Lancer, Super Fantasy Zone, Break In, Star Parodier (Removed), Cho Aniki, Final Soldier, Digital Champ: Battle Boxing, Gradius II: Gofer no Yabou, Bomberman '94, Detana!! TwinBee, Wonder Boy III: Monster Lair, Pulseman, Secret Command, Street Fighter II: Champion Edition, Castlevania: Rondo of Blood, Ironclad, Ufouria: The Saga and Monster World IV. Furthermore, at least two import titles (DoReMi Fantasy and Puyo Puyo 2) were released without any English translation, and thus only Japanese text is available in these games while Monster World IV was fully translated to English.

=== PAL region ===
A total of 17 NES, SNES, N64, Mega Drive and TurboGrafx titles were available at launch on the Virtual Console in Europe and 11 titles for the Oceanic region (TurboGrafx games were first added there from July 6, 2007). There were 385 titles in Europe and 384 titles in Australia and New Zealand for the Wii, 168 titles for Nintendo 3DS (178 for Nintendo 3DS Ambassadors) and 258 titles for Wii U available.

Though the Virtual Console titles primarily cover only the games that have been released in Europe, Nintendo UK has commented that there is a possibility that in the future, Nintendo will localize Japanese and North American games that have never been released in Europe such as Super Mario RPG, which was released on the European Virtual Console on August 22, 2008, after being unreleased in that region for 12 years. In March 2007, Hudson released three TurboGrafx games which were not originally released in Europe: Double Dungeons, Dragon's Curse, and Battle Lode Runner. Five Hanabi Festivals have been held since, releasing former Japanese and/or North American exclusive titles.

== Wii ==
=== Library history ===
The first few Virtual Console games were released to the Wii Shop Channel on November 19, 2006, alongside the launch of the Wii.

While the gameplay remains unchanged for all of the classic titles offered for the Virtual Console, Nintendo stated that some games could be improved with sharper graphics or better frame rates. In reality, however, many games suffered from drops in frame rate or had graphical glitches not present in the original, and many PAL SNES games ran with significantly reduced borders compared to the original cartridge releases. As with disc-based games, the Virtual Console service was region-locked—that is, different versions of games are provided to different regions, and game availability varied from region to region.

Satoru Iwata stated in a speech on March 23, 2006, that Nintendo, Sega, and Hudson Soft were working in collaboration to bring a "best of" series of games to the Wii. At E3 2006, Hudson also declared it would bring upwards of 100 titles to the Wii's Virtual Console. Additionally, Hudson mentioned that its lawyers were working on acquiring the licenses to games from now defunct companies. Nintendo announced MSX compatibility on September 19, 2006, announcing on February 23, 2007, that the MSX titles Eggy and Aleste would be released in Japan. In February 2007, a heading for Neo Geo AES games was added to the Japanese Virtual Console page, and in September of that same year, games for that system appeared on the list of future releases, priced at 900 points each. Also in September Hudson announced that games made for the TurboGrafx-CD format would also join the Virtual Console beginning in October 2007, with five titles to be released for the remainder of 2007 and ten titles for 2008, each priced at 800 points.

On June 1, 2007, Nintendo of America issued a press release to announce the upcoming release of its 100th Virtual Console title, which was Zelda II: The Adventure of Link. Within this press release, Nintendo stated that more than 4.7 million Virtual Console games had been downloaded, at a rate of more than 1,000 titles an hour.

Neo Geo AES support was added on September 18, 2007, for the Japanese Virtual Console, becoming the first addition to the list of consoles since the TurboGrafx-16 was added two days after the U.S. launch.

On October 9, 2007, Nintendo announced that 7.8 million Virtual Console titles had been downloaded, and as of December 2007, this number topped ten million.

Games from several new past consoles were added during 2008: Master System on February 26, 2008, for Japan's Virtual Console; Commodore 64 support was added on March 28, 2008, for Europe's Virtual Console. and MSX support was added on May 27, 2008, for Japan's Virtual Console.

On February 23, 2009, the first three Commodore 64 titles (International Karate, The Last Ninja and Pitstop II) were added to the North America Virtual Console for the first time.

On March 25, 2009, simultaneously with Nintendo's Keynote Speech at Game Developers Conference, Nintendo launched 'Virtual Console Arcade', launching with four titles, Mappy, The Tower of Druaga, Star Force and Gaplus.

On February 4, 2011, Sega announced that a Virtual Console release of Puyo Puyo, released in Japan in Spring 2011, is the first Virtual Console to feature Wi-Fi support for online multiplayer.

The Wii Shop Channel had functionality to allow games to be updated. This was used to update Military Madness, Star Fox 64/Lylat Wars, Kirby 64: The Crystal Shards (in North America and Europe), and Mario Kart 64 (in Europe and Australia). Several NES and SNES games released before March 30, 2007 were also given updates in Europe and Australia to fix previous problems with the Wii component cables. These updates are free of charge to those who purchased a previous version of the game.

In later years, some games were removed from the service due to their licenses expiring, namely R-Type and Teenage Mutant Ninja Turtles, among others. The three Donkey Kong Country SNES games produced by Rare were withdrawn for unknown reasons despite Nintendo retaining the rights to them, and were later reinstated after being added to the Wii U eShop. Sonic the Hedgehog and its sequel Sonic the Hedgehog 2 were both removed in Japan in 2012. While the games returned to the Wii Shop Channel in 2013, they were removed yet again on October 30, 2015, on the Japanese Wii Shop Channel and Xbox Live Arcade in that region while the 3D Classics versions ported by M2 were still available on the Nintendo 3DS for download via the 3DS eShop. However, the games would remain available in both North America and Europe on the Wii Shop Channel and Xbox Live Arcade. While these and other removed titles can no longer be found or purchased from the Shop Channel, they remain available to those who have purchased them prior to their removal. Wii mini lacks digital distribution. Such users may still re-download them on their Wii consoles and even transfer them to a Wii U system using the "system transfer" tool. Any Wii Virtual Console titles can be transferred to the Wii U and played via its Wii Mode.

=== Control ===
Virtual Console games can be played using different controllers. The Wii Remote itself (turned on its side) can be used for NES, Master System, TurboGrafx-16, and some Mega Drive/Genesis and Neo Geo AES games. The original and the pro versions of Classic Controller (sold separately from the console) can be used for all Virtual Console games. The controllers from the GameCube can also be used for all games on the Virtual Console, except for some multiplayer TurboGrafx-16 games that use the GameCube controller for the fifth player. As a result of this, the wireless GameCube controller (the WaveBird) has seen increased popularity.

All Virtual Console games have their buttons mapped to the respective buttons on the controllers, however, in certain circumstances, users can use X and Y instead of A and B, if the original controller does not have X and Y buttons (for example the NES). In certain titles, such as Nintendo 64 games, there may be specific controls tailored to the Classic Controller or GameCube Controller. Nintendo 64 titles that originally provided force feedback via the Nintendo 64 controller's Rumble Pak peripheral, however, are not supported by the built-in "Rumble" feature of the Wii Remote (with a Classic Controller attached) and the GameCube controller.

With the release of Bomberman '93, it was revealed that TurboGrafx-16 games can support full five-player games. Since a single Wii can only have four Wii Remotes and four GameCube controllers connected at the same time, a combination of the two are needed for five-player games. The same issue is found in 5-8 player Commodore 64 games as well. Because the Wii U doesn't have GameCube controller ports, only up to four-player games can be played on the system.

	Wii Remote	Classic Controller (Note: The NES Classic Controller, the SNES Classic Edition Controller, and Club Nintendo's SNES Classic Controller have at least partial functionality with all Wii Virtual Console releases but may require button remapping to accommodate for the lack of buttons.)	GameCube Controller	USB Keyboard
NES/Famicom	✓	✓	✓	✗
Super NES/Super Famicom	✗	✓	✓	✗
Nintendo 64	✗	✓	✓	✗
TurboGrafx-16/PC Engine	✓	✓	✓	✗
Master System	✓	✓	✓	✗
Genesis/Mega Drive	✓	✓	✓	✗
Neo Geo AES	✓	✓	✓	✗
Commodore 64	✓	✓	✓	✗
MSX	✓	✓	✓	✓
Virtual Console Arcade	✓	✓	✓	✗

GameCube Controller is compatible with all Wii models except Wii Family Edition and Wii mini. MSX games also support USB keyboards, as the original system featured their input. However, Commodore 64 titles use a pop-up "virtual" keyboard, which can be toggled on and off by pressing the "1" button on the Wii Remote, and are only used to set up the game and are not for input during gameplay.

=== Titles ===
System	Japan, Taiwan, and Hong Kong	North America	PAL regions		South Korea
System	Japan, Taiwan, and Hong Kong	North America	Europe	Australia	South Korea
Commodore 64 (NA & PAL Regions only)	-	9	19	-	-
MSX (Japan only)	13	-	-	-	-
NES/Famicom	147	94	79	77	23
Master System	14	15	15	15	-
TurboGrafx-16/PC Engine	119	59	58	58	-
Genesis/Mega Drive	91	73	74	74	-
Super NES/Super Famicom	102	63	64	65	13
Neo Geo AES	75	54	54	54	-
Nintendo 64	20	21	21	21	4
Virtual Console Arcade	78	21	20	20	-
Total	659	398	385	384	40

=== Storage ===
Games downloaded from the Virtual Console library can be stored in the Wii's built-in 512 MB flash memory.

Wii system software versions 2.0 and later allow Virtual Console and WiiWare games to be moved from the console's internal memory to a removable SD card and then back to the same console. Wii Menu 4.0 added a new menu to run channels from an SD card provided there is enough free space to hold a copy of the channel in internal memory. If the console runs out of memory, the SD menu will offer to move other channels to the SD card.

Virtual Console games are locked to the Wii on which they were purchased—they cannot be transferred to another Wii via an SD card, although it is possible to purchase games in the Wii Shop Channel and send them as gifts to people on their Wii Friends list. This procedure does not work across regions and it has been reported that purchased titles cannot be sent to users from other countries either, even if they are on the same region. In the event that a Wii is damaged and the Virtual Console games can no longer be played, Nintendo will provide support (if the serial number or console e-mail name can be provided). Also, if a Wii owner transfers all data on their console to a Wii U, the ability to download those titles from the Wii Shop Channel, along with all save data currently on the Wii, is transferred.

=== Game saves and save data ===
Game saving is functional and intact on the Virtual Console for all games which originally had a save feature on their cartridge. Saved games are saved to the Wii Internal Memory and function exactly as the original cartridge did. A game that in its original cartridge form did not have any form of save feature will not have any save game feature on the Virtual Console (though depending on its original system it may have the suspend feature as described below).

Most first-party N64 games used internal cartridge memory for game save data and thus will save properly on the Virtual Console. A select few first-party and nearly all other N64 game cartridges utilized the extra memory capability of the N64 Controller Pak. Saving of data to the Controller Pak is not supported by the Virtual Console, so for those games which used this feature, the save feature will not work properly in the Virtual Console.

An extreme example is that of Mario Kart 64 which uses internal cartridge memory for progress and save game data. Consequently, all progress is saved properly (since it was saved to the cartridge itself) but one of the features in Mario Kart 64 (saving ghosts for racing at a later date) will not work, since that particular feature utilized the Controller Pak, and the option to copy data to the Controller Pak won't function in those games.

=== Suspending play ===
Like other emulation software, the Wii Virtual Console enables the user to suspend play of a game at any time. To do this, users simply return to the Wii main menu from the game. Two exceptions to this are the N64 and Neo Geo AES, titles which do not support this feature. The N64 will allow play to be halted by returning to the Wii Menu but will require the person to start from the title screen to continue playing. Note that suspending play enables the player to pause the game indefinitely but does not function as a "save state" in that, once the game is resumed, the user will be able to pause play again (overwriting the suspend point) but will not be able to return to the previously suspended state.

The suspend feature will not be available if the user resets the Wii with the reset button on the front of the console during gameplay. Further, if the Wii loses power during gameplay, there is no further suspend state, nor will there be a way to restart from the previous suspend state. There are some exceptions, however. Arcade games released by Bandai Namco feature an updated menu and when reset during gameplay, the save state will be saved before the console is reset.

=== South Korea releases ===
There were 10 titles total of NES, Super NES, and Nintendo 64 games available at launch on the Virtual Console for South Korea. The store updates irregularly on Tuesdays. There are 40 titles available. Depending on the game, they are playable in either Japanese or English. Super Mario World is the only game that can be bought in either language. Companies currently supporting by publishing games are Bandai Namco Entertainment, Hudson Soft, Irem, Konami, Nintendo, Taito and Windysoft.

=== Taiwan and Hong Kong releases ===
Since Nintendo of Taiwan and Nintendo of Hong Kong never offered a Chinese version of the Wii console in Hong Kong or Taiwan, they have released Japanese Wii's in that region and by hardware extensions, the Japanese Virtual Console is also available for customers in Taiwan and Hong Kong and like other regions are able to buy Japanese Nintendo Points cards at certain retailers.

== Nintendo 3DS ==
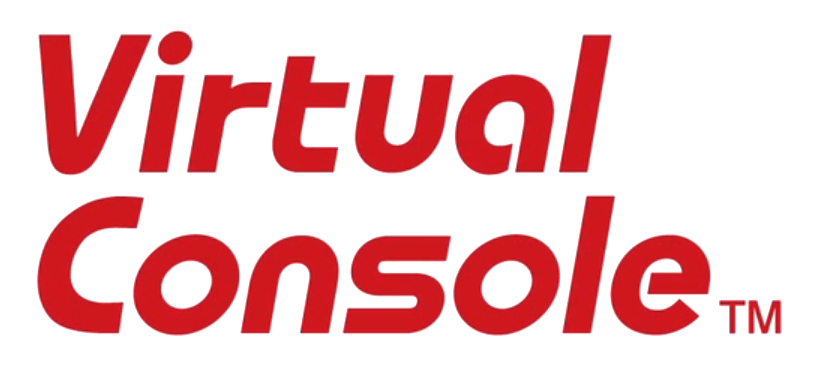
The Nintendo 3DS Virtual Console logo

=== Library history ===
On June 6, 2011, Nintendo launched the Virtual Console service for the Nintendo 3DS on the Nintendo eShop. Games released for the service included titles for the Game Boy, Game Boy Color, NES, Super NES (New Nintendo 3DS only), Game Gear and TurboGrafx-16 games (available in Japan only). There were also special features available while playing Virtual Console games, such as viewing classic Game Boy titles with the traditional green screen or viewing them in an emulated border.

A separate, but related set of games are 3D Classics, which are remakes of classic titles that make use of the Nintendo 3DS's stereoscopic 3D capabilities.

When asked if Virtual Boy games were going to be available for download on the Virtual Console for the Nintendo 3DS, Nintendo of America President Reggie Fils-Aimé told Kotaku that he couldn't answer, as he was unfamiliar with the platform.

"As a consumer, I have experience with every Nintendo platform and, I think every accessory, including the Superscope, with the exception of the Virtual Boy... so it's difficult for me to articulate a point of view back to our parent company [in Japan] why we absolutely have to have a Virtual Boy store"

— Reggie Fils-Aimé

The author of the piece, Kotaku's Stephen Totilo, called upon readers to "argue for a Virtual Boy store on the Nintendo 3DS, if you can."

In response to an August 2011 price drop on the Nintendo 3DS hardware, Nintendo announced plans to give early adopters of the system a number of Virtual Console releases as appreciation of their support. Owners of the system who logged into the Nintendo eShop by a specified time in their home markets became "Nintendo 3DS Ambassadors". In September 2011, ten NES titles were made available through Virtual Console to the Ambassadors at no cost before their general release; the games included marquee titles such as Super Mario Bros. and The Legend of Zelda. They were released to the general public for purchase at a later date, with additional features such as simultaneous multiplayer across multiple systems; Ambassadors received the new features as free software updates. On December 16, 2011, Ambassadors received access to ten Game Boy Advance titles, also at no charge, that were never released to those who are not Ambassadors. Unlike other Virtual Console-branded releases, GBA games are not emulated, but rather they run directly on an ARM7TDMI processor core; the "AGB_FIRM" kernel running on the other CPUs is responsible for emulating the Game Pak, applying a video filter, and allowing the brightness to be adjusted or the game quit without manually rebooting the 3DS. Many save types supported by AGB_FIRM (many of them having been discovered in September 2017, after injection became convenient and accessible to most users of custom firmware) were not employed in the ten official GBA releases, but can be used by games unofficially "injected" into a GBA VC title.

On February 1, 2012, Punch-Out!! the first non-ambassador NES game was released on the Virtual Console service. Since then, other NES games that were not part of the ambassador program were released including third party games by Capcom, Konami, and Tecmo such as; Mega Man, Castlevania, and Ninja Gaiden. Furthermore, two NES import titles were added in North American and Europe; Summer Carnival '92 Recca and The Mysterious Murasame Castle in both 2013 and 2014, respectively. Game Boy Advance games were never released to non-Ambassadors on the Nintendo 3DS.

TurboGrafx-16/PC Engine games were added to the service in Japan starting with Gradius and China Warrior on December 25, 2013, in Japan. R-Type and Alien Crush were later added a few months later in February, the following year. No new TG-16 games were added to the Virtual Console service again afterward.

On November 12, 2015, it was announced that during a Nintendo Direct that Pokémon Red, Pokémon Blue, and Pokémon Yellow would be released on the Virtual Console service on February 27, 2016, to celebrate the 20th anniversary of the series. The games featured Local Play for trading Pokémon and battling, replacing the game link cable due to the Nintendo 3DS having wireless connections, but Game Boy Printer features in Pokémon Yellow, like other titles on the Virtual Console, was not be usable on the Nintendo 3DS.

On March 4, 2016, during a Nintendo Direct, Nintendo announced the addition of SNES games on Virtual Console for New Nintendo 3DS. Taking advantage of its upgraded hardware on the New 3DS, the games support "Perfect Pixel mode", which allows these games to be played at their original resolution and aspect ratio. SNES games are not supported on the original Nintendo 3DS models or Nintendo 2DS.

=== Titles ===
System	Japan	North America	PAL region		South Korea	Taiwan and Hong Kong
System	Japan	North America	Europe	Australia	South Korea	Taiwan and Hong Kong
Game Boy	72	51	50	50	13	4
Game Boy Color	25	31	29	29	7	3
Game Boy Advance (Nintendo 3DS Ambassadors only)	10	10	10	10	-	-
Game Gear	22	16	16	16	-	-
NES/Famicom	112	65	63	63	15	-
Super NES/Super Famicom (New Nintendo 3DS only)	49	30	31	31	-	-
PC Engine (Japan only)	4	-	-	-	-	-
Nintendo 3D Classics	6	6	6	6	-	-
Sega 3D Reprint Archives	18	16	16	16		
Total	318	224	221	221	35	7

=== Storage ===
Virtual Console games are saved on an SD card and are accessible through the Nintendo 3DS home menu.

=== Game saves and save data ===
The save feature for the Nintendo 3DS Virtual console service is similar to the Wii's. However, unlike the Wii's, the games can save a single "restore point" that can be used as much as the player wants to but is replaced and overwritten if the player makes another one.

=== South Korea releases ===
Before the Nintendo 3DS Virtual Console officially fully launched in South Korea, the New Nintendo 3DS Super Mario Bros. 30th Anniversary bundle came with the Virtual Console version of Super Mario Bros. pre-installed. The full launch includes six games with three being for the NES and three of them being for Game Boy.

=== Taiwan and Hong Kong releases ===
Nintendo of Hong Kong launched the Virtual Console in Taiwan and Hong Kong for the first time in Nintendo 3DS/Nintendo 3DS XL systems in Chinese, their first releases are the Japanese versions of Pokémon Red, Pokémon Blue, Pokémon Green and Pokémon Yellow for Game Boy on the same day of the Japanese release on February 27, 2016. The Pure White Nintendo 3DS released in Taiwan & Hong Kong uses the Japanese region firmware but all online features are blocked so the Japanese Nintendo eShop can't be used and likewise the Japanese Virtual Console can't be used either.

== Wii U ==
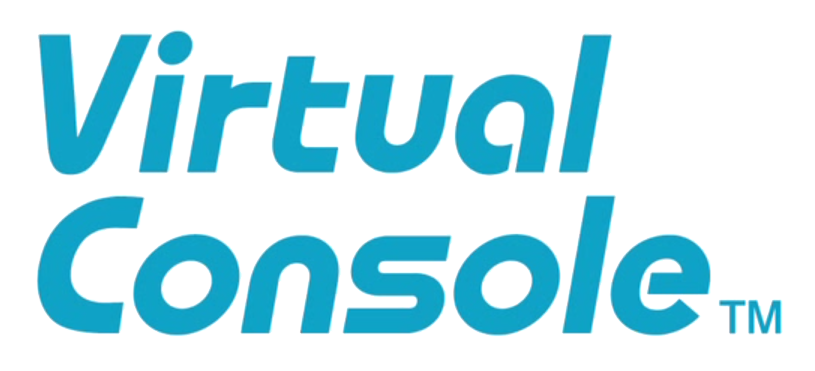
The Wii U Virtual Console logo

=== Library history ===
In January 2013, Nintendo announced a native version of Virtual Console, which would be launched for Wii U on April 26, 2013, in North America and April 27, 2013, in the United Kingdom. Initial releases came from the NES and Super NES libraries, with Game Boy Advance titles being made available starting April 3, 2014, with Nintendo 64 and Nintendo DS being added starting April 1, 2015. Unlike with the Wii, titles originally released on the arcades and non-Nintendo consoles (with the exception of the TurboGrafx-16) were not offered.

In a July 2011 interview, Nintendo's Amber McCollum stated that select GameCube titles would be made available for download on the Wii U console via the Wii U's own Nintendo eShop. However, no titles were made available.

Wii U Virtual Console titles include the option to use Off-TV Play on the Wii U GamePad and Miiverse integration. Users who owned the Wii Virtual Console version of a game could purchase the Wii U Virtual Console version of that game for a discounted price. Nintendo also announced some individual games would be released prior to the full Virtual Console launch as part of a special promotion celebrating the 30th anniversary of the release of the Famicom. Existing Wii Virtual Console games can be accessed via the Wii Mode. The UK Virtual Console service offered versions of games from both North America and Japan, in lieu of slower PAL versions. On December 25, 2013, TurboGrafx-16/PC Engine and MSX titles were added to the service in Japan. In January 2014, Nintendo announced Nintendo DS games for the Wii U Virtual Console. In June 2014, the Nintendo DS game Dr. Kawashima's Brain Training: How Old Is Your Brain? was released on the Wii U Virtual Console in Japan and PAL regions. On April 1, 2015, Nintendo DS and Nintendo 64 games were added to the Wii U Virtual Console, immediately after a Nintendo Direct announcing them. On June 14, 2015, prior to Nintendo's E3 presentation, Mother was released worldwide the Virtual Console service under the title "EarthBound Beginnings". Mother had been planned for a 1991 release in North America, with Nintendo having fully translated the game into English before shelving the release. On July 14, 2016, TurboGrafx-16 support was finally added to the North American Virtual Console, launching with three games; Bonk's Adventure, New Adventure Island, and R-Type. Anyone who had downloaded them via the Wii Shop Channel on the Wii or Wii Mode would get those titles discounted between $2.99-3.99. TurboGrafx-16 support was added to the European Virtual Console two weeks later on June 28, 2016.

=== Control ===
	Wii U GamePad (Off-TV Play)	Wii U Pro Controller	Wii Remote	Wii Classic Controller (Note: NES Classic Controller, the SNES Classic Edition Controller and Club Nintendo's SNES Classic Controller have at least partial functionality with all Wii U Virtual Console releases except DS games, but may require button remapping to accommodate for the lack of buttons.)	USB Keyboard
NES/Famicom	✓	✓	✓	✓	✗
Super NES/Super Famicom	✓	✓	(Note: Wii Remote is compatible with SNES and GBA releases, but may require button remapping to accommodate for the lack of buttons.)	✓	✗
Nintendo 64 (Control Stick only / Control Stick and Control Pad	✓	✓	✗	✓	✗
Nintendo 64 (Control Pad only)	✓	✓	✓	✓	✗
TurboGrafx-16/PC Engine	✓	✓	✓	✓	✗
MSX	✓	✓	✓	✓	✓
Game Boy Advance	✓	✓		✓	✗
Nintendo DS	✓	✗	✗	✗	✗

==== Rumble compatibility ====
The rumble feature is only used when playing Nintendo 64 games or Drill Dozer, and is not used when playing Game Boy Advance games which feature the Game Boy Player rumble or Nintendo DS games. When playing Nintendo 64 games or Drill Dozer with the Wii Classic Controller, the rumble feature cannot be used due to a lack of a built-in rumble motor. Although the Wii Remote is supported for Kirby 64: The Crystal Shards, the rumble feature only works using the Wii U GamePad or Wii U Pro Controller, which emulate the Nintendo 64 Rumble Pak.

	Wii U GamePad (Off-TV Play)	Wii U Pro Controller	Wii Remote
Nintendo 64	✓	✓	✗
Game Boy Advance (Drill Dozer)	✓	✓	✓

=== Titles ===
System	Japan	North America	PAL region
NES/Famicom	148	94	89
Super NES/Super Famicom	101	51	49
Nintendo 64	22	21	21
TurboGrafx-16/PC Engine	52	40	40
MSX (Japan only)	23	-	-
Game Boy Advance	102	74	70
Nintendo DS	31	31	31
Total	479	311	300

=== Storage ===
Virtual Console games are saved either on the Wii U's flash storage (8GB or 32GB) or can be saved on a USB flash drive or external hard drive.

=== Game saves and save data ===
The save feature for the Wii U Virtual console service is similar to the Wii's. However, unlike the Wii's, the games can save a single "restore point" that can be used as much as the player wants to, but is replaced and overwritten if the player makes another one. Game saves from Wii Virtual Console games cannot be transferred to the Wii U versions.

== Differences from original games ==
Virtual Console releases are generally faithful emulations of the original games, without any lost or added features. However, for various reasons, the gameplay experience is not always identical to the original.

Some Nintendo 64 games offered optional features that required peripheral hardware, such as the Rumble Pak or the Controller Pak; because these peripherals are not available, their respective benefits are not present. For example, Mario Kart 64 cannot save "Ghost Data" since no Controller Pak is available. and both Mario Golf and Mario Tennis cannot use a Transfer Pak to copy data between games. The original N64 release of Pokémon Snap allowed players to take their Game Paks to special in-store kiosks to print stickers of their in-game photos; the Wii Virtual Console version emulates this by letting players send a photo to the Wii Message Board. Similarly, the 3DS Virtual Console versions of The Legend of Zelda: Link's Awakening DX and Super Mario Bros. Deluxe for the Game Boy Color cannot print photos that had previously required the Game Boy Printer peripheral. Game Boy games that generally required two systems and two games often did not retain its respective multiplayer modes in their Virtual Console releases.

Other changes occurred due to the difference in hardware between their original and Virtual Console releases. For example, Super Mario World is often cited as being more difficult to play due to the GameCube controller's buttonlayout being quite different from the SNES controller. Similarly, the differences in buttons between the Nintendo 64 controller and the Wii's Classic Controller caused some difficulties with gameplay. The PAL versions of some games only run at 50 Hz, while others run at a smoother 60 Hz.

Some games have been altered cosmetically to address licensing and copyright issues. Tecmo Bowl (NES) originally included the names of real football players licensed from the NFL Players Association, but since the game's release, Electronic Arts obtained exclusive rights to the license; consequently, the names were removed from the Virtual Console version, with only the players' numbers being shown. In other cases, like Wave Race 64 in game content with Kawasaki logos were replaced with Wii and Nintendo DS banners due to licensing issues with Kawasaki. The Genesis game The Revenge of Shinobi originally featured Spider-Man as a boss character, but because the license to that character had expired, the 2009 release for Virtual Console changes the character to pink. Some games had password systems changed; Kid Icarus (NES), had its password system altered to disable certain special passwords that gave the main character special powers or large amounts of money, while Mario Golf's later release removed a password that previously unlocked secret golf tournaments.

== Reception ==
Publications generally had mixed reception to the Virtual Console. Wired and Nintendo World Report both criticized the disparity between the American and Japanese libraries, both in quantity and quality. IGN similarly criticized the comparatively low number percentage of games available on the service, and the individual game's prices, which they felt was too high to justify buying them another time. Other publications, such as Vulture and Kotaku praised the game lineup. In a 2018 retrospective, Kotaku praised the games themselves, but criticized many of the details of the Virtual Console, concluding "In short, the only thing that was any good about Virtual Console was the games themselves. Not the pricing, not the slow-as-molasses release schedule, and not the emulation wrapper."

== Nintendo Classics successor ==
Starting from the Nintendo Switch family of systems, Nintendo abandoned the Virtual Console label in favor of a subscription service via Nintendo Switch Online. Users have access to a continuously updated library of retro games as long as they remain actively subscribed, rather than purchasing individual titles. The service, originally launched as "Nintendo Switch Online classic game libraries" was later rebranded as simply "Nintendo Classics" in 2025, concurrently with the launch of the Nintendo Switch 2 console. In 2026, Nintendo reiterated their support of the subscription service setup of Nintendo Classics over the individual purchasing of games of the Virtual Console.

== See also ==
- Sega Forever
