= Douglas E. Smith =

American video game programmer (1960–2014)

Douglas Edwin Smith
- Smith circa 1985
- Born: October 28, 1960
- Died: September 7, 2014 (aged 53)
- Occupations: Video game designer Video game programmer Video game producer
- Notable work: Lode Runner

Douglas Edwin Smith (October 28, 1960 – September 7, 2014), usually credited as Doug Smith, was an American video game designer and programmer, best known as the author of the 8-bit game Lode Runner (1983), considered a seminal work of the 1980s.

Smith, of Renton, Washington, wrote his most famous game while studying architecture at the University of Washington. Over a summer break, he wrote the game in Fortran with some Pascal and assembly, using the school's mainframe VAX-11/780. It was played on monochrome terminals by other students who provided feedback and levels, and became a cult hit on campus, where it could be played anywhere there was a VAX terminal. After his nephew asked to play it on an Apple II Plus personal computer, he ported it over a 3-day weekend to 6502 assembly language. He borrowed money to purchase a color monitor and joystick and continued to improve the game. Around Christmas 1982, he submitted the game to four publishers and quickly received offers. He took the deal with Broderbund and the game was published for personal computers in 1983. It was one of the first games to include a level editor. While the game sold hundreds of thousands of copies in the United States, in Japan it sold millions, becoming the first Western video game to attain major success in Japan.

His credits include Lemmings, Final Fantasy VII, and Secret of Mana. He contributed to the localization of Chrono Trigger and was the executive producer of Secret of Evermore.

Smith died at 53 years old on September 7, 2014. According to his daughter, the cause of death was suicide.
