= 029 =

029 may refer to:

- IBM 029, a keypunch machine
- Xi'an and Xianyang (telephone area code "029")
- Cardiff, the Cardiff local dialling code
