= Data verification =

Data verification is a process in which different types of data are checked for accuracy and inconsistencies after data migration is done. In some domains it is referred to Source Data Verification (SDV), such as in clinical trials.

Data verification helps to determine whether data was accurately translated when data is transferred from one source to another, is complete, and supports processes in the new system. During verification, there may be a need for a parallel run of both systems to identify areas of disparity and forestall erroneous data loss.

Methods for data verification include double data entry, proofreading and automated verification of data. Proofreading data involves someone checking the data entered against the original document. This is also time-consuming and costly. Automated verification of data can be achieved using one way hashes locally or through use of a SaaS based service such as Q by SoLVBL to provide immutable seals to allow verification of the original data.

== See also ==
- Data validation
- Verification and validation
