= UNITYPER =

The UNITYPER was an input device for the UNIVAC I computer manufactured by Remington Rand, which went on sale in mid-1951 but was not in operation until June 1952. It was an early direct data entry system. The UNITYPER accepted user inputs on a keyboard of a modified Remington typewriter, then wrote that data onto a metal magnetic tape using an integral tape drive. The UNITYPER II was an input device for the UNIVAC II.

The UNITYPER II was a reduced-size, reduced-cost version of the UNITYPER I subsequently developed as a text-to-tape transcribing device for the UNIVAC I system and released in 1953, also sold as a peripheral to the UNIVAC II. The original required individual motors and control amplifiers to advance, rewind, fast-forward and maintain tension on the tape. UNITYPER II replaced these with a flexible cable and clutch system driven by a single within the typewriter.

Coding was accomplished via mechanical lift arms and latching bails added to the typewriter's existing mechanical linkages in place for print-action. When a key was depressed, up to 8 affiliated lift arms were "caught" on latching bails which in turn connected 8 coding switches to the recording head. A commutator, powered by the internal drive motor, would momentarily complete the power circuit through the coding switches to the recording head before advancing the tape to the next recording position. When not encoding, a resistor balance network kept the recording head in an erase mode unless a rewind operation was commanded. This ensured a clearly defined magnetic space between bit patterns. Additional circuits prevented opening of the tape loading door once a tape was loaded.

Because the supply and take-up spools of the recording tape were no longer individually powered as in the UNITYPER 1, a "differential moment" was created as the tape moved from one reel to the other during encoding, the supply reel constantly decreasing in effective diameter while the take-up reel correspondingly increased. A differential spring, ratching escapement, and slip clutches were added as a mechanical solution, which functioned also during backspacing and rewinding.
