= Inforex =

Data system company

Inforex Inc. corporation manufactured and sold key-to-disk data entry systems in the 1970s and mid-1980s. The company was founded by ex-IBM engineers to develop direct data entry systems that allowed information to be entered on terminals and stored directly on disk drives, replacing keypunch machines using punched cards or paper tape, which had been the dominant tools for data entry since the turn of the twentieth century.

== Background information ==
Key-to-disk systems were systems that took data entered by users from keypunch-like keyboards and held the information on a hard disk. The information was then transferred from disk to 1/2-inch magnetic tape for processing on the user's mainframe computer.

At the time, large-scale entry of data for processing on a mainframe computer was labor-intensive and expensive. For example, a typical sales order might go through the following steps:

1) Order written on contract, collected by the salesman. 2) Order transferred to paper order sheet (unusually with multiple carbon copies) transcribed by the salesman or a secretary. 3) Order sheet, after verification and approval passed to the Data Center for entry into the computer system for processing. 4) Order sheet, entered by a keypunch operator to cards for processing. 5) Order card(s) verified by a second keypunch operator by repeating the card-punching, to verify accuracy. 6) Order card read by computer. 7) Parts ordered, equipment purchased.

The same tried and practised methods were used to bill the customer, record customer payments, and pay outgoing expenses.

The advantage of key-to-disk systems over card punches was the ability to see the entire content of an 80 byte card on a monitor to edit and correct mistakes.

The Inforex Key-to-Disk-to-Tape system allowed an operator to directly read, edit, and write back any single tape record directly onto the original 9 track output tape, in the record's original position on the tape, allow keying errors to be corrected quickly.

== Systems ==
=== 1301 Key-to-Disk ===
The original processor had four registers, one being 8-bit, used for data, and the other three being 12-bit, used for data manipulation and addresses. The commands for the processor were 8 and 16 bits long. The original disk capacity was 800 kilobytes (kB). The original system had 2kB of non-volatile magnetic core memory. The final version of the 1301 had 12kB of memory. The system supported eight keystations.

The Inforex Hardware Design used generic printed circuit (PC) cards, to which were soldered a variety of the small-scale integrated circuits (ICs) of the time, which were inter-connected on the opposite side of the PC board by point-to-point soldering of enamel-coated wires. These wiring networks were complicated and intricate; they were initially assembled by Computer Numerical Controlled systems. Repair, and correction of circuit design errors, were handled mostly by field office personnel for no more than 30 to 50 wiring changes on a single board; larger circuit design changes were handled by the factory and their programmed assembly systems.

=== 1302 Key-to-Disk ===
This was an expansion of the 1301 system, released two years after the 1301 system. The biggest difference was that the system could support sixteen key stations in two banks of eight, and 12kB of memory.

=== 1303 Key-to-Disk ===
The 1303 was a total redesign of the 1301 system with a new backplane. The disk drive capacity was 2.4 megabytes. The processor address bus was now 16 bits and the instruction set consisted of 8, 16, and 24 bit instructions. Core memory was increased to 24kB. Additional capabilities were added, including a communications card which allowed the system to send data using a 300/1200/2400/4800 baud modem.

The company also made model 3300 max-edit data entry and model 5000 for high volume data base management. These used 5-platter "washing machine" style hard drives.

=== System 5000 Turnkey File Management System ===
Already a leading key-to-disk data entry system maker with the 1300 series, in the early 1970s Inforex tried to expand by creating turnkey file management systems, in response to a request from Westinghouse, which was trying to keep track of 750,000 blueprints (engineering drawings) with a manual system. Most business computer applications were written in the COBOL programming language, and could take up to two years to develop. The System 5000 anticipated by more than a decade early personal computer applications such as PFS:File and dBASE II. The system used two-letter commands entered on video terminals.

The first step was to create a file format which would allow the user to type a form directly onto the screen, using fixed text for headings, and indicating where variable data fields would get populated from the data file. The format could be associated with a data file created by an existing application, or used to create a new one by entering records interactively. v1.0 supported only sequential files, but search performance was predictably terrible, and multi-key indexed sequential files were quickly added in v2.0. Once the format was created and associated with a file, the user employed intuitive commands such as:

AR = Add Record (to a sequential file)

IR = Insert Record (to an indexed file)

TR = Transfer Record (from one file to another)

DR = Delete Record

In v4.0 of the System 5000, a processing language similar to IBM's RPG was added, to allow computation, manipulation and transformation of data across multiple files when records were added or updated.

The revolutionary ease of use of this system can best be illustrated by an anecdote. When the first system was installed at Westinghouse, the site employee directory was loaded into a file, and a terminal was given to the company receptionist to direct phone calls and visitors appropriately. The next time the Inforex SE came in, the receptionist proudly showed off the new application she had created by herself to help out her friend, the parking lot security guard. With the application, she could track all the assigned parking spaces and the license numbers entitled to park in each one. She could even monitor the Employee of the Month space, and who was allowed to park there each month.

However, the company never quite figured out how to market their system. Its data entry products were sold as productivity upgrades to production data entry departments, which during the 1960s had used keypunches to enter data onto punch card decks. Inforex could market the 1300 series by showing the improvement in productivity, measured in keystrokes per hour, and the reduction in errors due to data being validated as it was typed. The System 5000, on the other hand, was an application engine, which needed to be sold to application development departments, or even directly to user departments impatient with the turnaround time to get a solution built by IT. The Inforex marketing and field organizations never quite figured out how to do this.

The System 5000, despite its advantages, had some severe technical deficiencies. It was still a batch system and often found itself used as a front end (computing) to a mainframe computer. For most applications, tapes needed to be moved between the 5000 and a mainframe drive. While the company was trying to market their advanced 5000 product, it quickly became obsolete due to powerful new multi-user interactive systems and mainframe operating systems that now used CRT-equipped terminals to enter data directly to a mainframe or minicomputer.

=== 7000 ===
The company developed one of the first distributed processing systems, the model 7000. All components of the system, except for the printers and monitors, were made by the company as third-party OEMs were not yet available. The machine was very innovative and powerful, featuring virtual memory, 16-bit architecture, features that only previously were available with expensive mainframes. The 7000 could have potentially been a barnstorming technical success but it suffered from main memory constraints. Initially maxed out at 64 kilobytes capacity, it had barely enough memory to run its advanced operating system, much less an application of any consequence. The 16-bit architecture made it difficult to expand the memory; by the time Inforex was able to expand to 128KB, 32-bit minicomputers had become available, able to address 8MB of memory and disks of very much higher capacity. Very few 7000's were sold, and the model quickly became obsolete.

== Bankruptcy ==
By this time, the key to disk market was also severely declining, again due to the direct entry terminal-based systems that now prevailed in the marketplace. The company became so cash strapped that they were forced into Chapter 11 and then Chapter 7 bankruptcy. In 1978 Inforex filed for bankruptcy due to the inability to market the 5000 and 7000 product lines profitably. They were eventually purchased by Datapoint, which itself ran into financial hardship in 1985, and sold Inforex to Recognition Equipment in Dallas, which had a competitive product and converted Inforex's customers to that product. Inforex's headquarters were in Burlington, MA, a few towns over from DEC (Digital Equipment Corp) headquarters in Maynard, MA. They had had sales and service offices throughout the US, Canada, Europe, UK, and Japan. In 1988 Inforex's headquarters were closed.
