= Paper data storage =

Use of paper as computer memory

Paper data storage refers to the use of paper as a data storage device. This includes writing, illustrating, and the use of data that can be interpreted by a machine or is the result of the functioning of a machine. A defining feature of paper data storage is the ability of humans to produce it with only simple tools and interpret it visually.

Though now mostly obsolete, paper was once an important form of computer data storage as both paper tape and punch cards were a common staple of working with computers before the 1980s.

== History ==
Before paper was used for storing data, it had been used in several applications for storing instructions to specify a machine's operation. The earliest use of paper to store instructions for a machine was the work of Basile Bouchon who, in 1725, used punched paper rolls to control textile looms. This technology was later developed into the wildly successful Jacquard loom. The 19th century saw several other uses of paper for controlling machines. In 1846, telegrams could be prerecorded on punched tape and rapidly transmitted using Alexander Bain's automatic telegraph. Several inventors took the concept of a mechanical organ and used paper to represent the music.

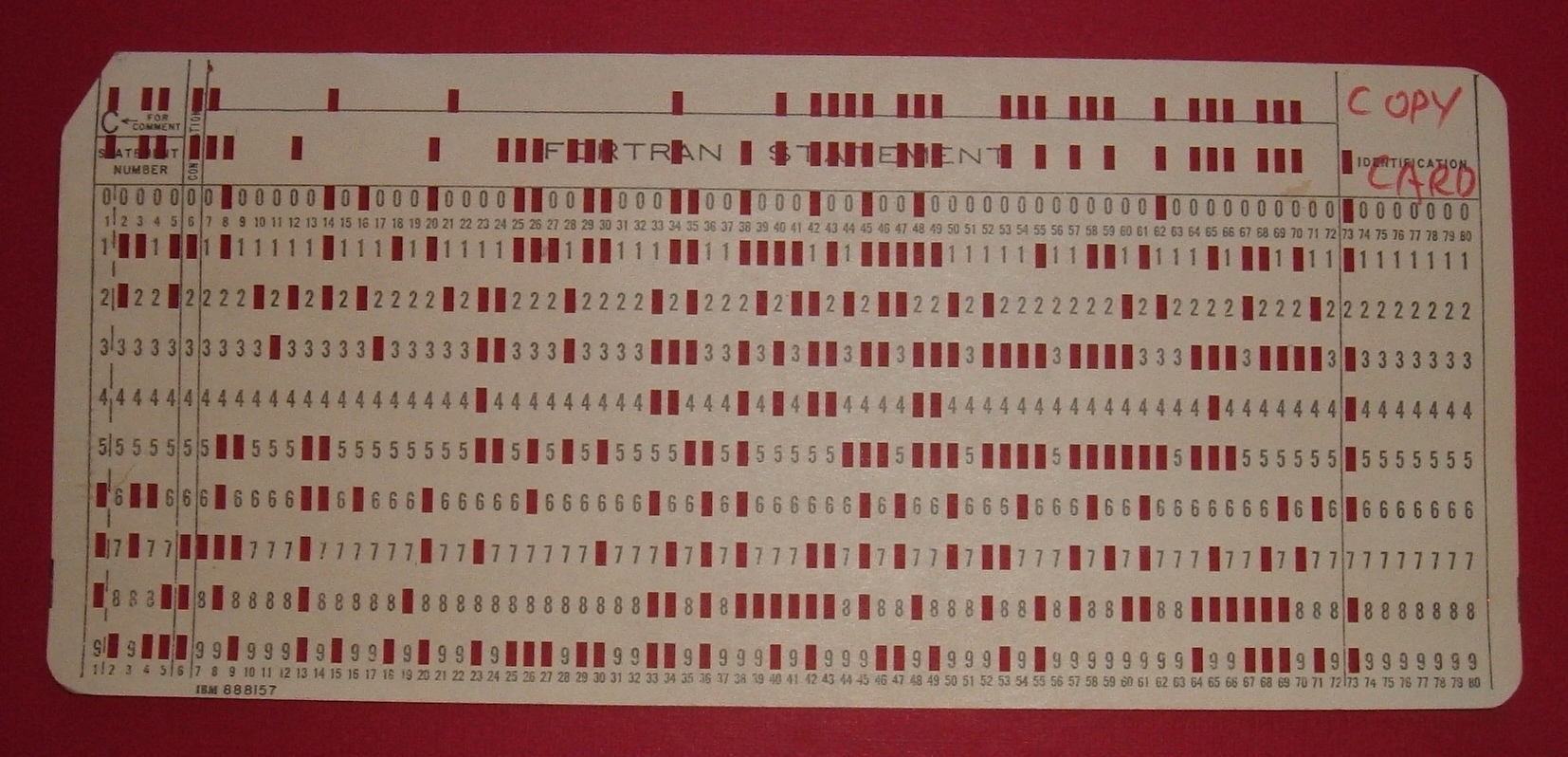

Binary punched card

In the late 1880s Herman Hollerith invented the recording of data on a medium that could then be read by a machine. Prior uses of machine readable media, above, had been for control (automatons, piano rolls, looms, ...), not data. "After some initial trials with paper tape, he settled on punched cards..." Hollerith's method was used in the 1890 census. Hollerith's company eventually became the core of IBM.

Other technologies were also developed that allowed machines to work with marks on paper instead of punched holes. This technology was widely used for tabulating votes and grading standardized tests. Banks used magnetic ink on checks, supporting MICR scanning.

In an early electronic computing device, the Atanasoff–Berry Computer, electric sparks were used to singe small holes in paper cards to represent binary data. The altered dielectric constant of the paper at the location of the holes could then be used to read the binary data back into the machine by means of electric sparks of lower voltage than the sparks used to create the holes. This form of paper data storage was never made reliable and was not used in any subsequent machine.

== Modern techniques ==
=== 1D barcodes ===
Barcodes make it possible for any object that was to be sold or transported to have some computer readable information securely attached to it. Universal Product Code barcodes, first used in 1974, are ubiquitous today. Some people recommend a width of at least 3 pixels for each minimum-width gap and each minimum-width bar for 1D barcodes. The density is about 50 bits per linear inch (about 2 bit/mm).

=== 2D barcodes ===
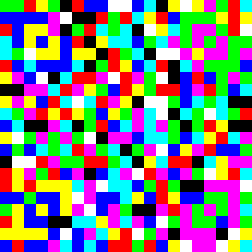
A JAB Code that encodes the text "Wikipedia".

2D barcodes allow to store much more data on paper, up to 2.9 kbyte per barcode. It is recommended to have a width of at least 4 pixels—e.g., a 4 × 4 pixel = 16 pixel module.

== Limits ==
The limits of data storage depend on the technology to write and read such data. The theoretical limits assume a scanner that can perfectly reproduce the printed image at its printing resolution, and a program which can accurately interpret such an image. For example, an 8 in × 10 in (200 mm × 250 mm) 600 dpi black-and-white image contains 3.43 MiB of data, as does a 300 dpi CMYK printed image. A 2,400 ppi True color (24-bit) image contains about 1.29 GiB of information; printing an image maintaining this data would require a printing resolution of about 120,000 dpi in black and white, or 60,000 dpi with CMYK dots.

== See also ==
- Banknote read by a vending machine
- Book music
- Digital preservation
- Edge-notched card
- Index card
- Kimball tag
- Machine-readable medium
- Magnetic ink character recognition
- Mark sense
- Music roll
- Optical mark recognition
- Paper disc
- Paper key
- Perfin
- Perforation
- Punched tape
- Spindle (stationery)
- Stenotype
- Ticker tape
