= Punched card =

Paper-based recording medium

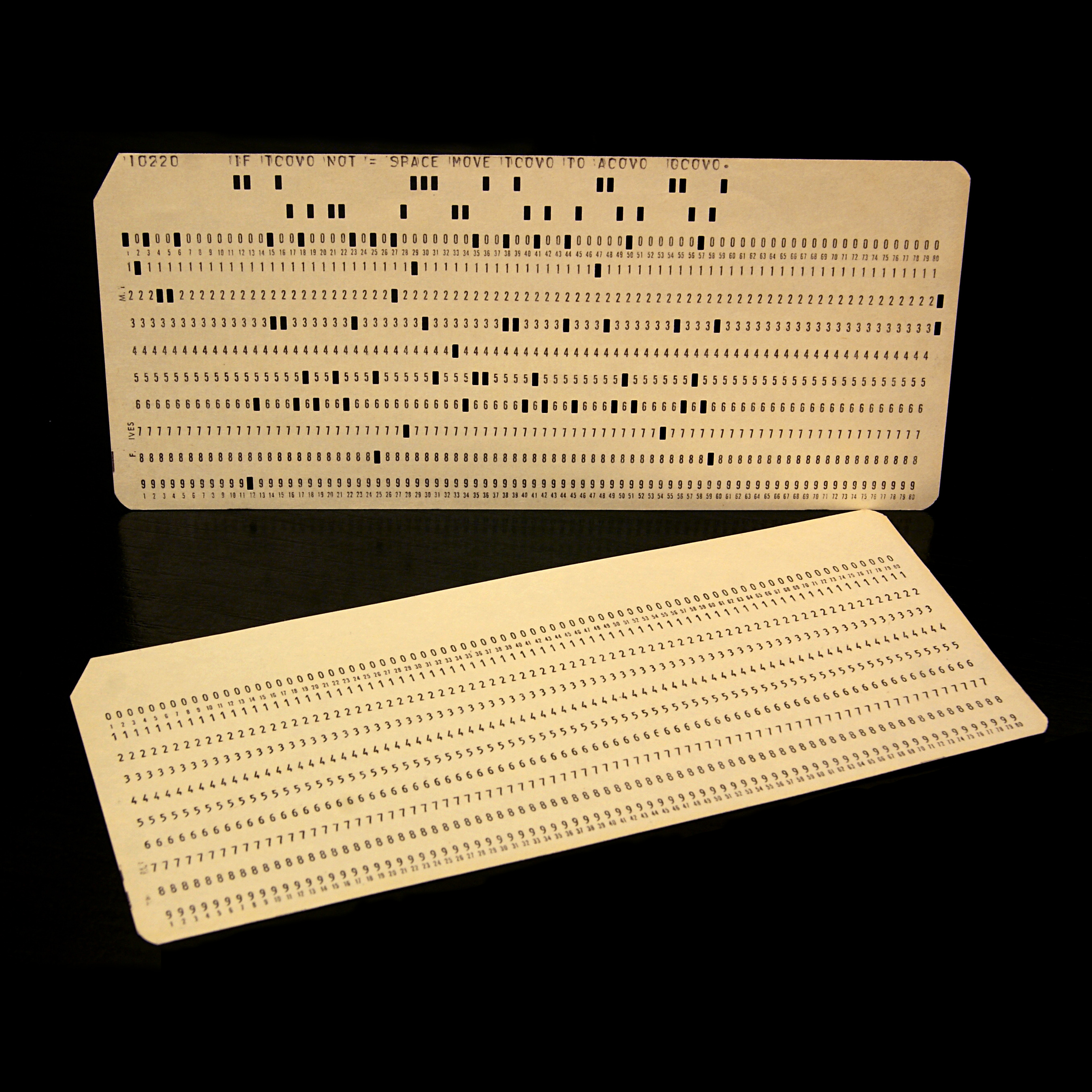
A set of two 12-row/80-column punched cards (one blank, one used) from the mid-twentieth century

A punched card (also punch card) is a stiff paper-based medium used to store digital information via the presence or absence of holes in predefined positions. Developed over the 19th to 20th centuries, punched cards were widely used for data processing, the control of automated machines, and computing. Early applications included controlling weaving looms and recording census data.

Punched cards were widely used in the 20th century, where unit record machines, organized into data processing systems, used punched cards for data input, data output, and data storage. The IBM 12-row/80-column punched card format came to dominate the industry. Many early digital computers used punched cards as the primary medium for input of both computer programs and data. Punched cards were used for decades before being replaced by magnetic-tape data storage.

Punched cards had a significant cultural impact in the 20th century. Their legacy persists in modern computing, influencing the 80-character line standard still present in some command-line interfaces and programming environments.

== History ==
The idea of control and data storage via punched holes was developed independently on several occasions in the modern period. In most cases there is no evidence that each of the inventors was aware of any other earlier work.

=== Precursors ===
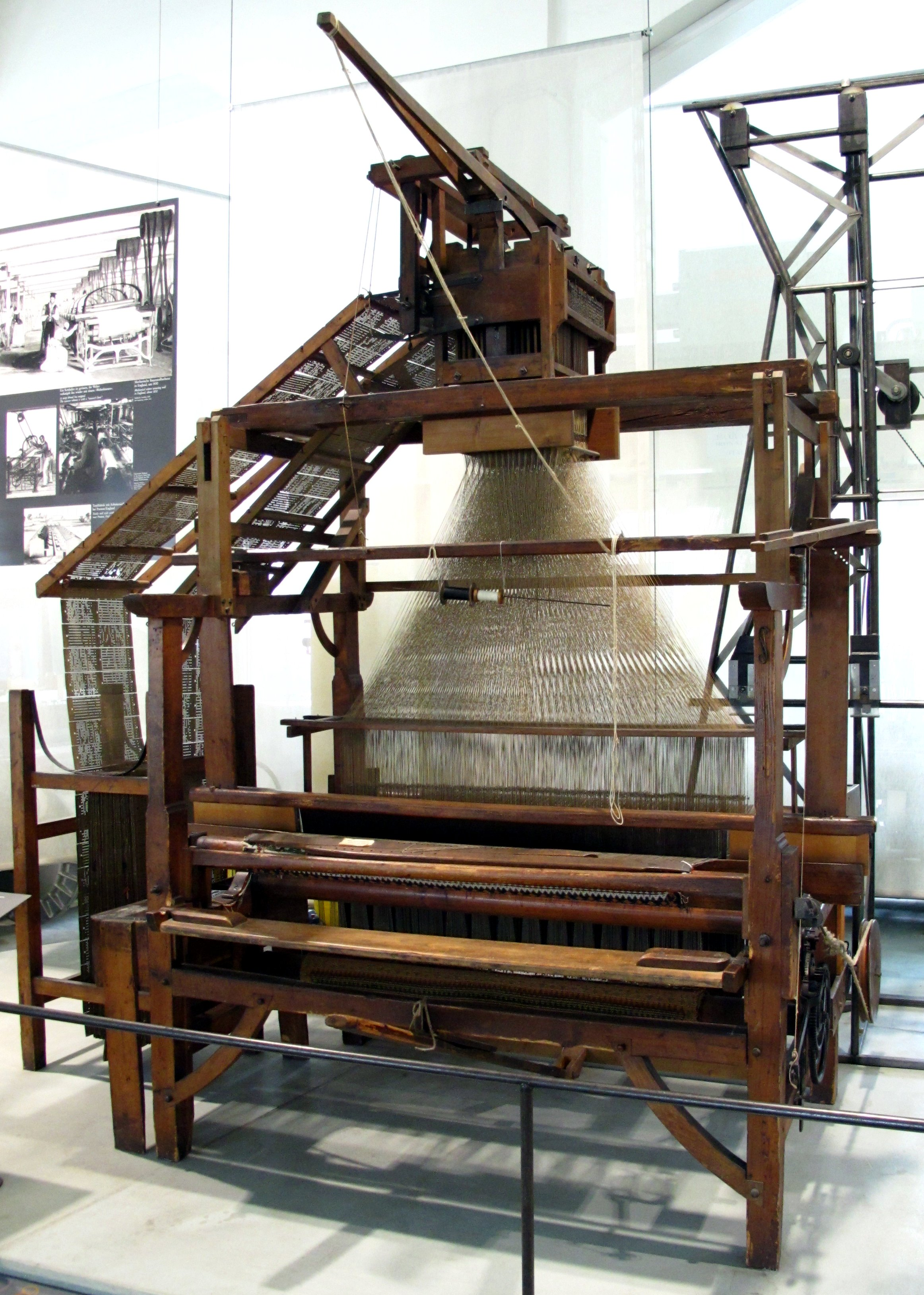
Carpet loom with Jacquard apparatus by Carl Engel, around 1860. The chain feed is on the left.

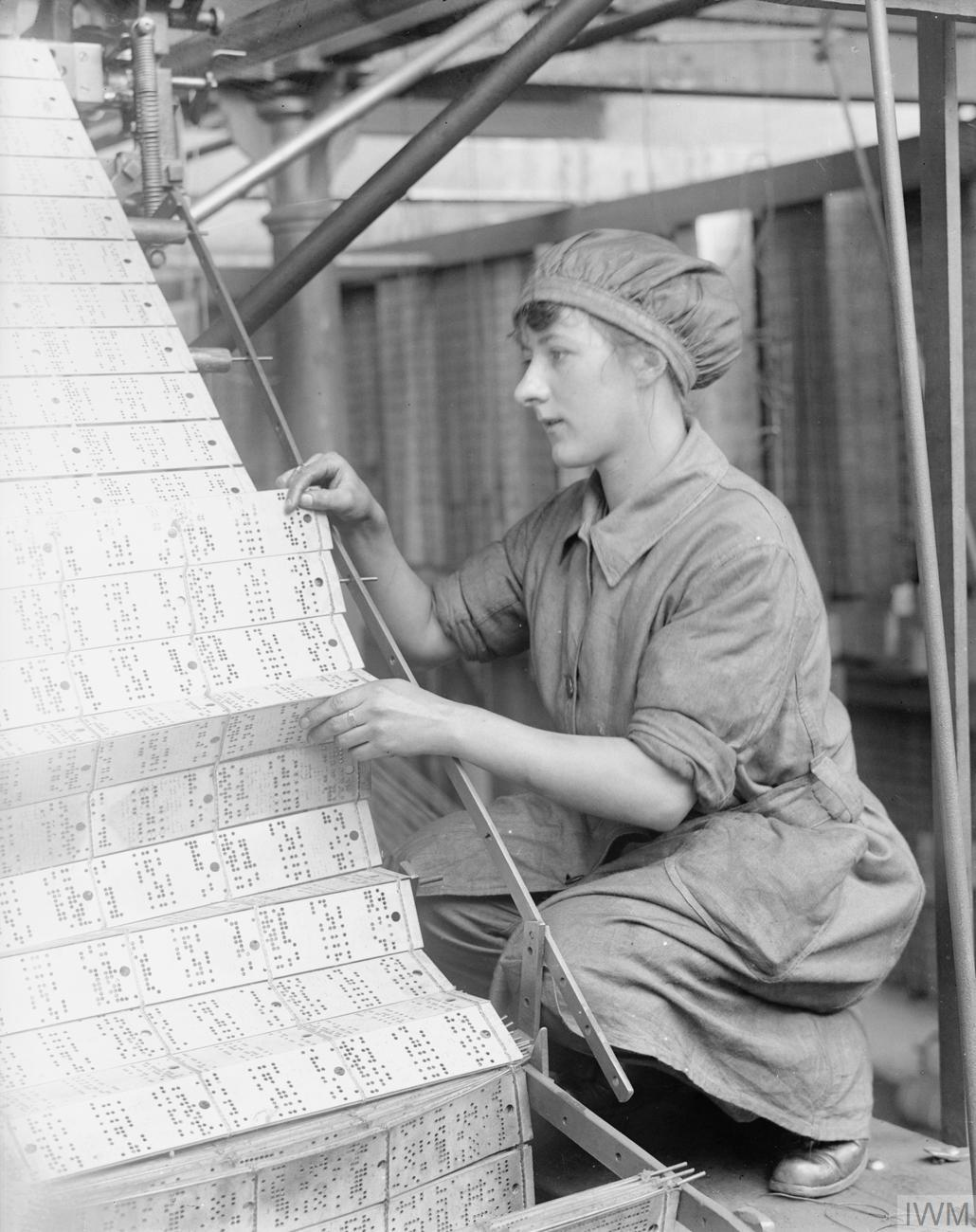
A worker changing Jacquard cards in a lace machine, September 1918. The pattern of the lace is dictated by the holes in the cards.

Basile Bouchon developed the control of a loom by punched holes in paper tape in 1725. The design was improved by his assistant Jean-Baptiste Falcon and by Jacques Vaucanson. Although these improvements controlled the patterns woven, they still required an assistant to operate the mechanism.

In 1804, Joseph Marie Jacquard demonstrated a mechanism to automate loom operation. Multiple punched cards were linked into a chain of any length. Each card held the instructions for shedding (raising and lowering the warp) and selecting the shuttle for a single pass.

Semyon Korsakov was reputedly the first to propose punched cards in informatics for information store and search. Korsakov announced his new method and machines in September 1832.

Charles Babbage proposed the use of "number cards", "pierced with certain holes and stand[ing] opposite levers connected with a set of figure wheels ... advanced they push in those levers opposite to which there are no holes on the cards and thus transfer that number together with its sign" in his description of the Calculating Engine's Store. There is no evidence that he built a practical example.

In 1881, Jules Carpentier developed a method of recording and playing back performances on a harmonium using punched cards. The system was called the Mélographe Répétiteur and described that "it writes down ordinary music played on the keyboard 'dans le langage de Jacquard'", that is, as holes punched in a series of cards. By 1887, Carpentier had separated the mechanism into the Melograph which recorded the player's key presses and the Melotrope which played the music.

=== 20th century ===
At the end of the 1800s Herman Hollerith created a method for recording data on a medium that could then be read by a machine, developing punched-card data-processing technology for the 1890 U.S. census. This was inspired in part by Jacquard loom weaving technology and by railway punch photographs. Punch photographs were quick ways for conductors to mark a ticket with a description of the ticket buyer (e.g., short or tall, dark or light hair). They were used to reduce ticket fraud, as conductors could "read" the punched holes to get a basic description of the person to whom the ticket was sold.

Hollerith's idea was to use the columns on the cards to define a certain characteristic, similar to the punch photographs concept, but also storing data like the person's age, birth country, first and second spoken languages and other data. As the operator punched the corresponding holes, an electrical contact in the punch caused a clock-like dial to advance one step. A bank of these counters could be connected to different locations on the card; for instance, a particular location that indicated the birth country was France would be connected to a dial, and every time someone from France was processed the counter would advance one place. Dividing that number with one that counted every card, one could calculate the fraction of people from France in seconds. This allowed the statistics for many different characteristics to be processed rapidly.

The cards were then collected as the official record, and could also be processed to extract further information. For instance, one could collect all the cards for the day and put them into a tabulating machine that sorted the cards by birth country into separate bins or hoppers. One could then collect the cards from a hopper, say the one for France, and feed just those cards through the machine again, this time set to sort based on the second language. In a few minutes one could extract the data on the languages spoken by people from different countries. Initially, these electromechanical machines only on counting holes, but by the 1920s they had units for carrying out basic arithmetic operations.

Hollerith founded the Tabulating Machine Company (1896), which was one of four companies that were amalgamated via stock acquisition to form a fifth company, Computing-Tabulating-Recording Company (CTR) in 1911. This was later renamed International Business Machines Corporation (IBM) in 1924. Other companies entering the punched-card business included The Tabulator Limited (Britain, 1902), Deutsche Hollerith-Maschinen Gesellschaft mbH (Dehomag) (Germany, 1911), Powers Accounting Machine Company (US, 1911), Remington Rand (US, 1927), and H.W. Egli Bull (France, 1931). These companies, and others, manufactured and marketed a variety of punched cards and unit record machines for creating, sorting, and tabulating punched cards, even after the development of electronic computers in the 1950s.

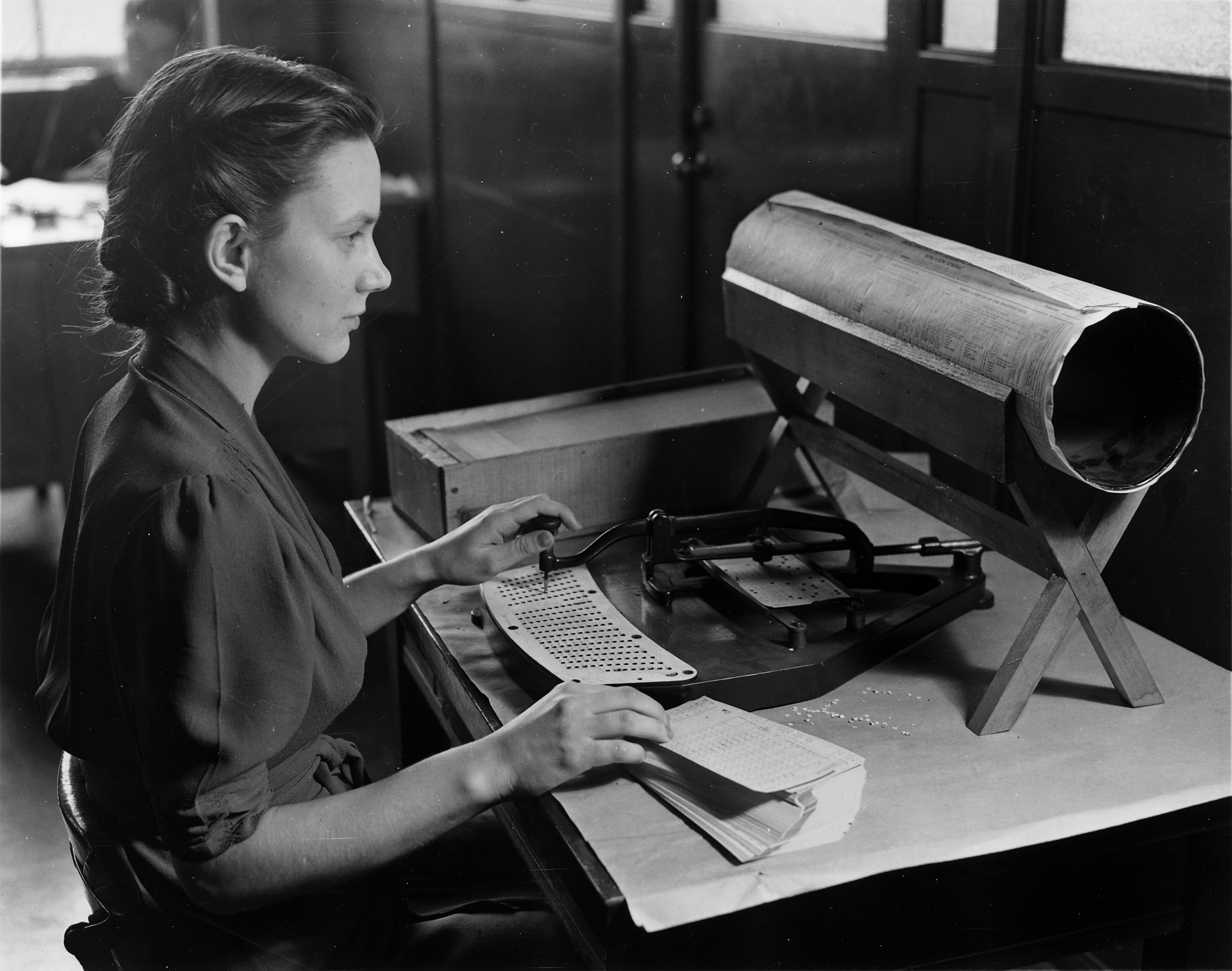
Woman operating the card puncher, c. 1940

Both IBM and Remington Rand tied purchases of the punched-cards to customers with machine leases, a violation of the US 1914 Clayton Antitrust Act. In 1932, the US government took both to court on this issue. Remington Rand settled quickly. IBM viewed its business as providing a service and that the cards were part of the machine. IBM fought all the way to the Supreme Court and lost in 1936; the court ruled that IBM could only set card specifications.

"By 1937 ... IBM had 32 presses at work in Endicott, N.Y., printing, cutting and stacking 5 to 10 million punched cards every day." Punched cards were even used as legal documents, such as U.S. Government checks and savings bonds.

During World War II punched card equipment was used by the Allies in some of their efforts to decrypt Axis communications. See, for example, Central Bureau in Australia. At Bletchley Park in England, "some 2 million punched cards a week were being produced, indicating the sheer scale of this part of the operation". In Nazi Germany, punched cards were used for the censuses of various regions and other purposes (see IBM and the Holocaust).

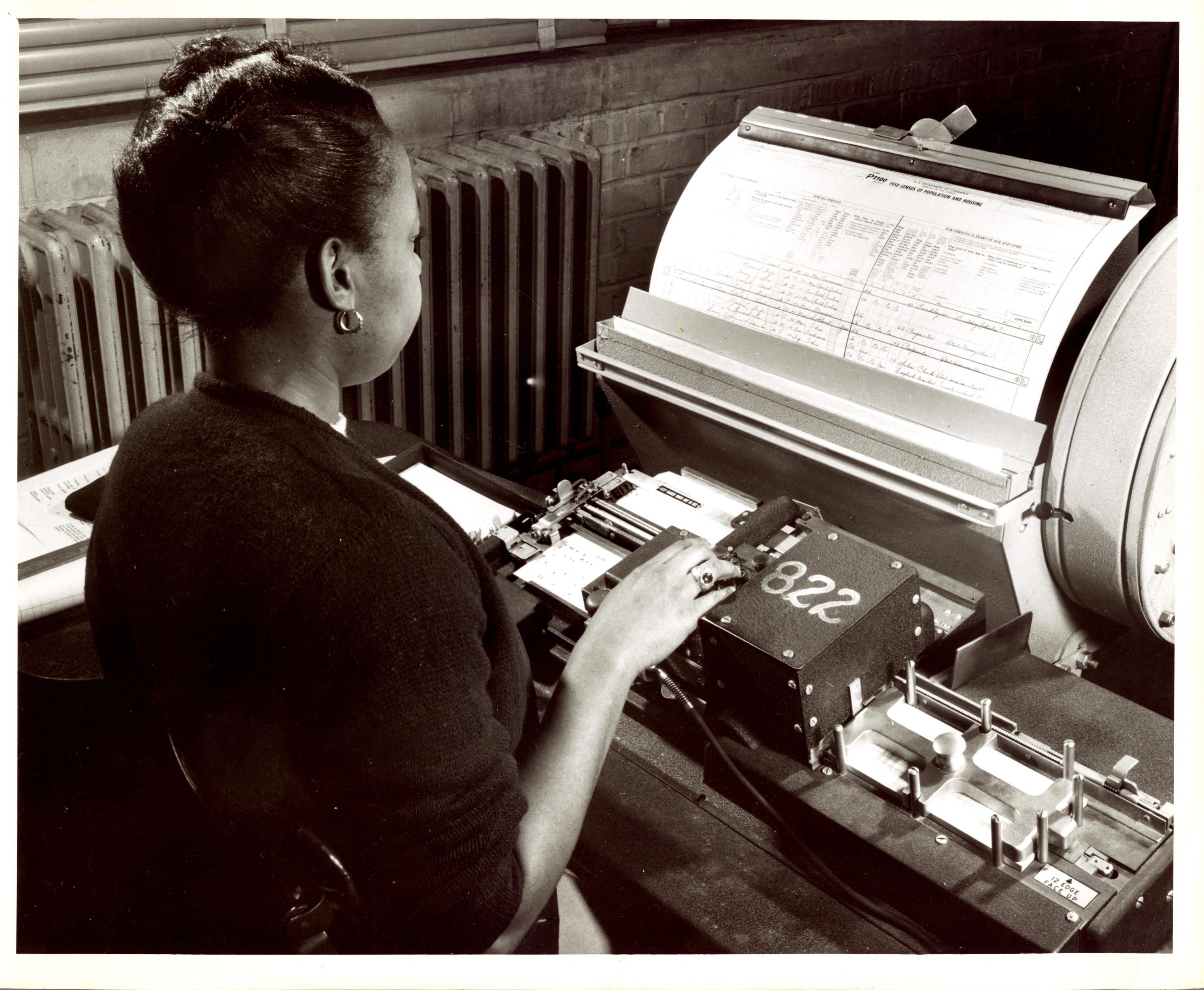
Clerk creating punch cards containing data from the 1950 United States census

Punched card technology developed into a powerful tool for business data processing. By 1950, punched cards had become ubiquitous in industry and government. "Do not fold, spindle or mutilate", a warning that appeared on some punched cards distributed as documents such as checks and utility bills to be returned for processing, became a motto for the post–World War II era.

In 1956 IBM signed a consent decree requiring, amongst other things, that IBM would by 1962 have no more than one-half of the punched card manufacturing capacity in the United States. Thomas Watson Jr.'s decision to sign this decree, where IBM saw the punched card provisions as the most significant point, completed the transfer of power to him from Thomas Watson Sr.

The Univac UNITYPER introduced magnetic tape for data entry in the 1950s. During the 1960s, the punched card was gradually replaced as the primary means for data storage by magnetic tape, as better, more capable computers became available. Mohawk Data Sciences introduced a magnetic tape encoder in 1965, a system marketed as a keypunch replacement, which was somewhat successful. Punched cards were still commonly used for entering both data and computer programs until the mid-1980s, when the combination of lower-cost magnetic-disk storage, and affordable interactive terminals on less expensive minicomputers made punched cards obsolete for these roles as well. However, their influence lives on through many standard conventions and file formats. The terminals that replaced the punched cards, the IBM 3270, for example, displayed 80 columns of text in text mode, for compatibility with existing software. Some programs still operate on the convention of 80 text columns, although fewer and fewer do, as newer systems employ graphical user interfaces with variable-width type fonts.

== Nomenclature ==
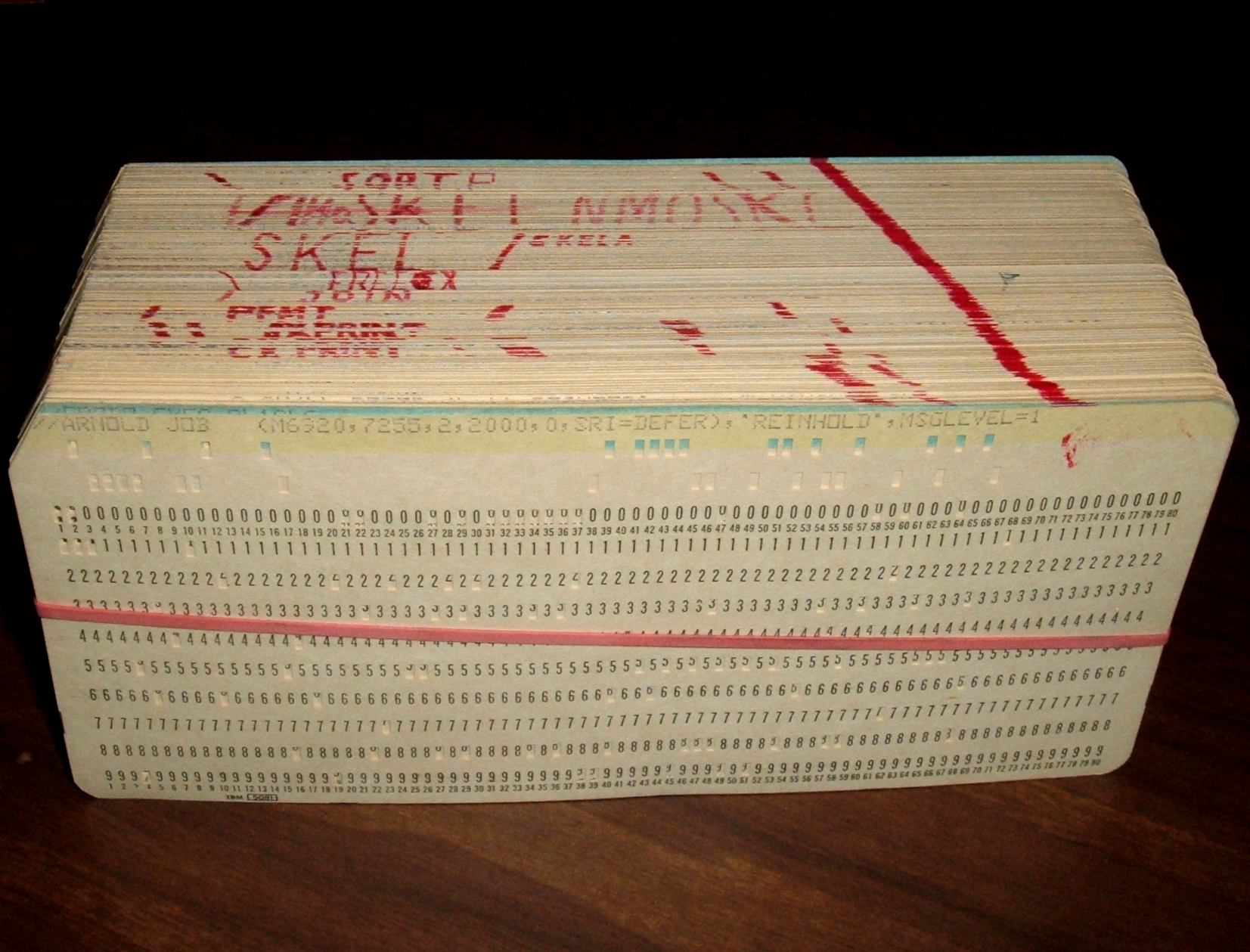
A deck of punched cards comprising a computer program. The red diagonal line is a visual aid to keep the deck sorted.

The terms punched card, punch card, and punchcard were all commonly used, as were IBM card and Hollerith card (after Herman Hollerith). IBM used "IBM card" or, later, "punched card" at first mention in its documentation and thereafter simply "card" or "cards". Specific formats were often indicated by the number of character positions available, e.g. 80-column card. A sequence of cards that is input to or output from some step in an application's processing is called a card deck or simply deck. The rectangular, round, or oval bits of paper punched out were called chad (chads) or chips (in IBM usage). Sequential card columns allocated for a specific use, such as names, addresses, multi-digit numbers, etc., are known as a field. The first card of a group of cards, containing fixed or indicative information for that group, is known as a master card. Cards that are not master cards are detail cards.

== Formats ==
The Hollerith punched cards used for the 1890 U.S. census were blank. Following that, cards commonly had printing such that the row and column position of a hole could be easily seen. Printing could include having fields named and marked by vertical lines, logos, and more. "General-purpose" layouts (see, for example, the IBM 5081 below) were also available. For applications requiring master cards to be separated from following detail cards, the respective cards had different upper-corner diagonal cuts and thus could be separated by a sorter. Other cards typically had one upper-corner diagonal cut, so that cards not oriented correctly, or cards with different corner cuts, could be identified.

=== Hollerith's early cards ===
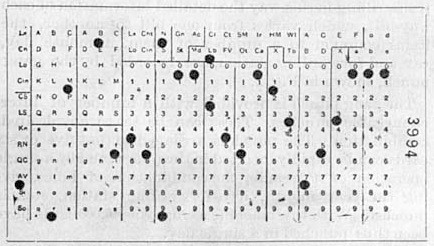
Hollerith card as shown in the Railroad Gazette in 1895, with 12 rows and 24 columns

Herman Hollerith was awarded three patents in 1889 for electromechanical tabulating machines. These patents described both paper tape and rectangular cards as possible recording media. The card shown in U.S. patent 395,781 of January 8 was printed with a template and had hole positions arranged close to the edges, so they could be reached by a railroad conductor's ticket punch, with the center reserved for written descriptions. Hollerith was originally inspired by railroad tickets that let the conductor encode a rough description of the passenger:

I was traveling in the West and I had a ticket with what I think was called a punch photograph ... the conductor ... punched out a description of the individual, as light hair, dark eyes, large nose, etc. So you see, I only made a punch photograph of each person.

When use of the ticket punch proved tiring and error-prone, Hollerith developed the pantograph "keyboard punch". It featured an enlarged diagram of the card, indicating the positions of the holes to be punched. A printed reading board could be placed under a card that was to be read manually.

Hollerith envisioned a number of card sizes. In an article he wrote describing his proposed system for tabulating the 1890 U.S. census, Hollerith suggested that a card 3 by 5 1/2 inches (7.6 by 14.0 cm) of Manila stock "would be sufficient to answer all ordinary purposes". The cards used in the 1890 census had round holes, 12 rows and 24 columns. A reading board for these cards can be seen at the Columbia University Computing History site. At some point, 3 1/4 by 7 3/8 inches (83 by 187 mm) became the standard card size. These are the dimensions of the then-current paper currency of 1862–1923. This size was needed in order to use available banking-type storage for the 60,000,000 punched cards to come nationwide.

Hollerith's original system used an ad hoc coding system for each application, with groups of holes assigned specific meanings, e.g. sex or marital status. His tabulating machine had up to 40 counters, each with a dial divided into 100 divisions, with two indicator hands; one which stepped one unit with each counting pulse, the other which advanced one unit every time the other dial made a complete revolution. This arrangement allowed a count up to 9,999. During a given tabulating run counters were assigned specific holes or, using relay logic, combination of holes.

Later designs led to a card with ten rows, each row assigned a digit value, 0 through 9, and 45 columns. This card provided for fields to record multi-digit numbers that tabulators could sum, instead of their simply counting cards. Hollerith's 45-column punched cards are illustrated in Comrie's The application of the Hollerith Tabulating Machine to Brown's Tables of the Moon.

=== IBM 80-column format and character codes ===
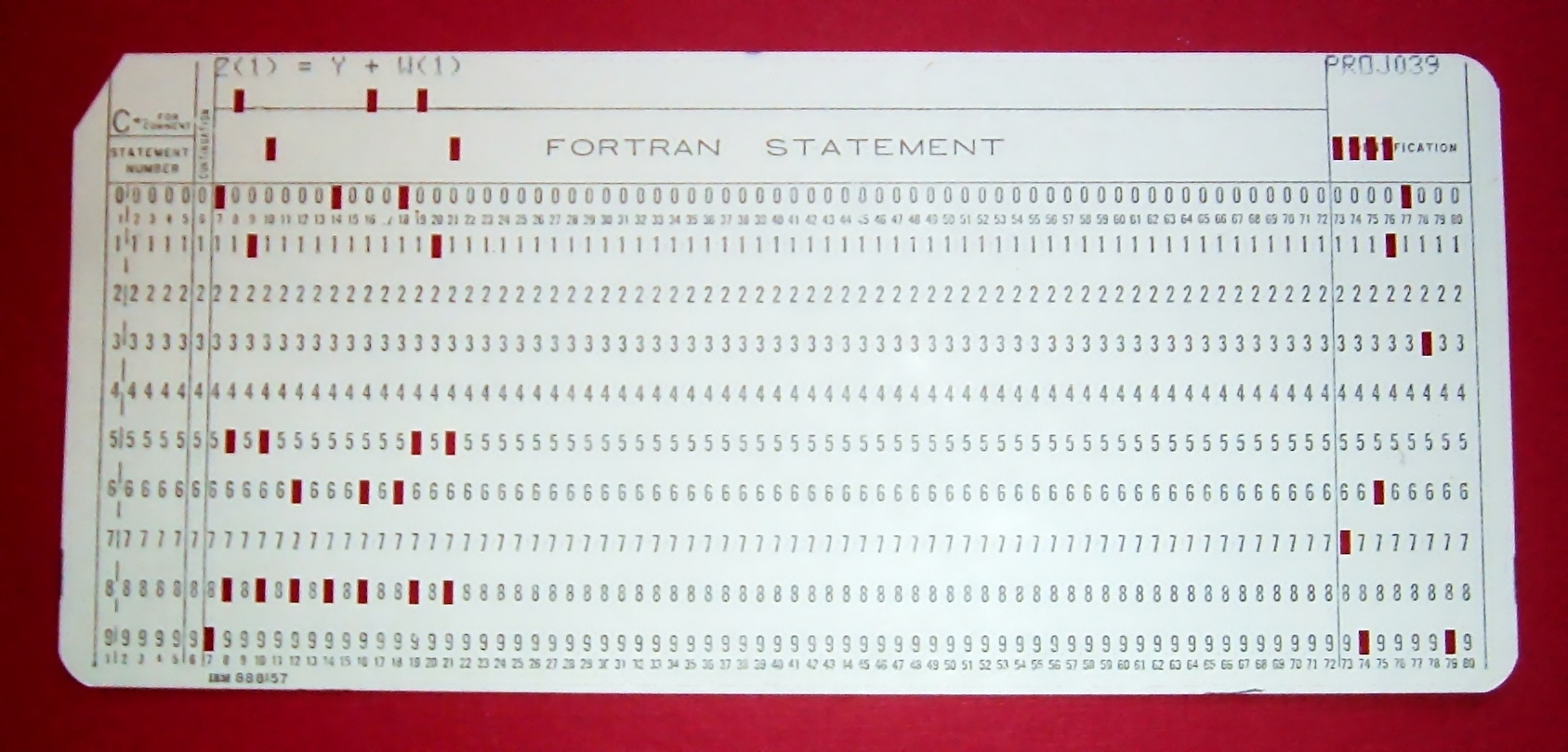
Punched card from a Fortran program Z(1) = Y + W(1), plus sorting information in the last 8 columns

By the late 1920s, customers wanted to store more data on each punched card. In 1927, Thomas J. Watson Sr., IBM's head, asked two of his top inventors – Clair D. Lake and J. Royden Pierce – to independently develop ways to increase data capacity without increasing the size of the punched card. Pierce wanted to keep round holes and 45 columns but to allow each column to store more data; Lake suggested rectangular holes, which could be spaced more tightly, allowing 80 columns per punched card, thereby nearly doubling the capacity of the older format. Watson picked the latter solution, introduced as The IBM Card, in part because it was compatible with existing tabulator designs and in part because it could be protected by patents and give the company a distinct advantage, and because "competitors using mechanical sensing of holes would find it difficult to make the change".

Introduced in 1928, the IBM card format had rectangular holes, 80 columns, and 10 rows. Card size is 7 3/8 by 3 1/4 inches (187 by 83 mm). The cards are made of smooth stock, 0.007 inches (180 μm) thick. There are about 143 cards to the inch (56/cm). In 1930, the IBM card format had rectangular holes, 80 columns, and 12 rows, with two more rows added to the top of the card for alphabetic coding. In 1964, IBM changed from square to round corners. They come typically in boxes of 2,000 cards or as continuous-form cards. Continuous-form cards could be both pre-numbered and pre-punched for document control (checks, for example).

Initially designed to record responses to yes–no questions, support for numeric, alphabetic and special characters was added through the use of columns and zones. The top three positions of a column are called zone punching positions, 12 (top), 11, and 0 (0 may be either a zone punch or a digit punch). For decimal data, the lower ten positions are called digit punching positions, 0 (top) through 9. An arithmetic sign can be specified for a decimal field by overpunching the field's rightmost column with a zone punch: 12 for plus, 11 for minus (CR). For Pound sterling pre-decimalization currency a penny column represents the values zero through eleven; 10 (top), 11, then 0 through 9 as above. An arithmetic sign can be punched in the adjacent shilling column. Zone punches had other uses in processing, such as indicating a master card.

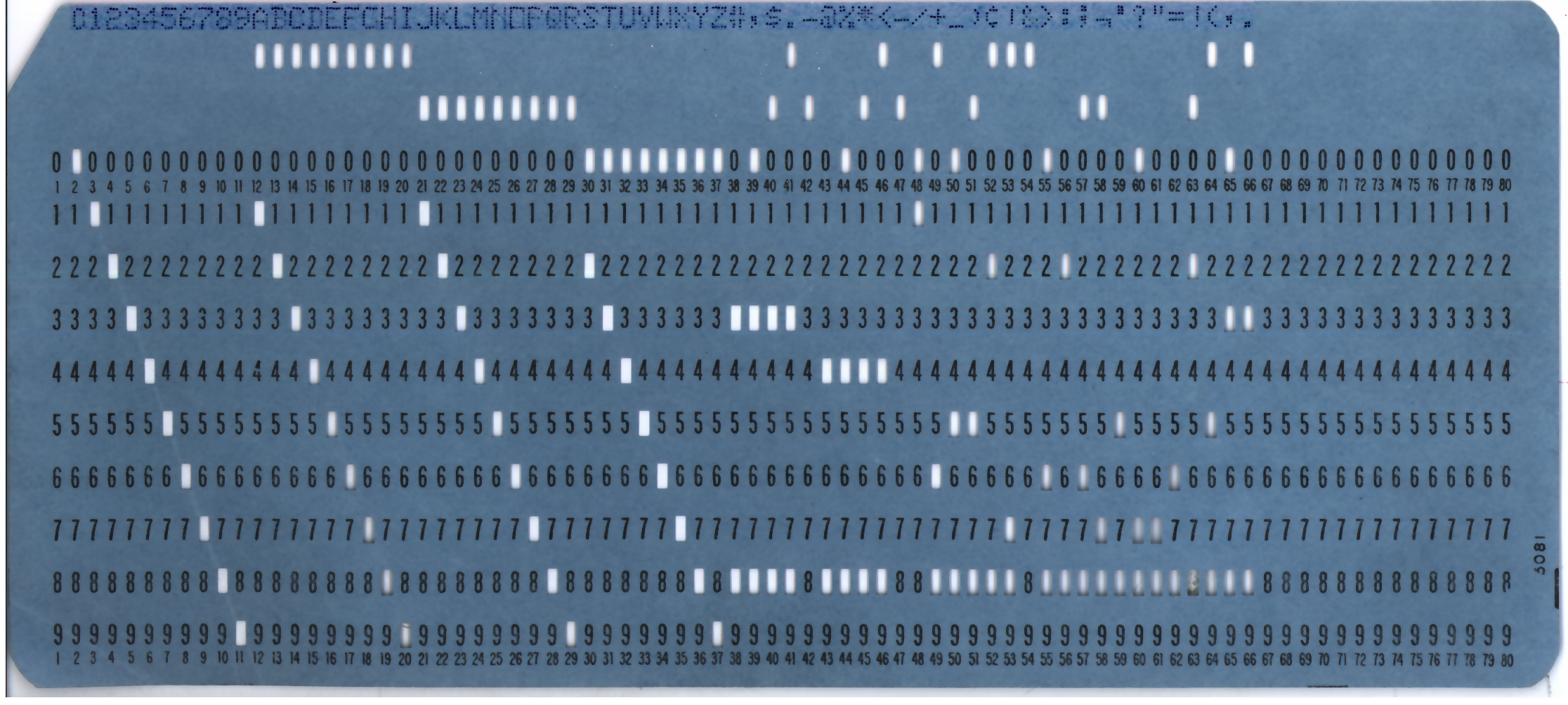
An 80-column punched card with the extended character set introduced with EBCDIC in 1964

Diagram:

    _______________________________________________
   / &-0123456789ABCDEFGHIJKLMNOPQR/STUVWXYZ
12|  x           xxxxxxxxx
11|   x                   xxxxxxxxx
 0|    x                           xxxxxxxxx
 1|     x        x        x        x
 2|      x        x        x        x
 3|       x        x        x        x
 4|        x        x        x        x
 5|         x        x        x        x
 6|          x        x        x        x
 7|           x        x        x        x
 8|            x        x        x        x
 9|             x        x        x        x
  |________________________________________________

Note: The 11 and 12 zones were also called the X and Y zones, respectively.

In 1931, IBM began introducing upper-case letters and special characters (Powers-Samas had developed the first commercial alphabetic punched card representation in 1921). (Note: Special characters are non-alphabetic, non-numeric, such as "&#,$.-/@%*?") The 26 letters have two punches (zone [12, 11, 0] + digit [1–9]). The languages of Germany, Sweden, Denmark, Norway, Spain, Portugal and Finland require up to three additional letters; their punching is not shown here. Most special characters have two or three punches (zone [12, 11, 0, or none] + digit [2–7] + 8); a few special characters were exceptions: "&" is 12 only, "-" is 11 only, and "/" is 0 + 1). The space character has no punches. The information represented in a column by a combination of zones [12, 11, 0] and digits [0–9] is dependent on the use of that column. For example, the combination "12-1" is the letter "A" in an alphabetic column, a plus-signed digit "1" in a signed numeric column, or an unsigned digit "1" in a column where the "12" has some other use. The introduction of EBCDIC in 1964 defined columns with as many as six punches (zones [12, 11, 0, 8, 9] + digit [1–7]). IBM and other manufacturers used many different 80-column card character encodings. A 1969 American National Standard defined the punches for 128 characters and was named the Hollerith Punched Card Code (often referred to simply as Hollerith Card Code), honoring Hollerith.

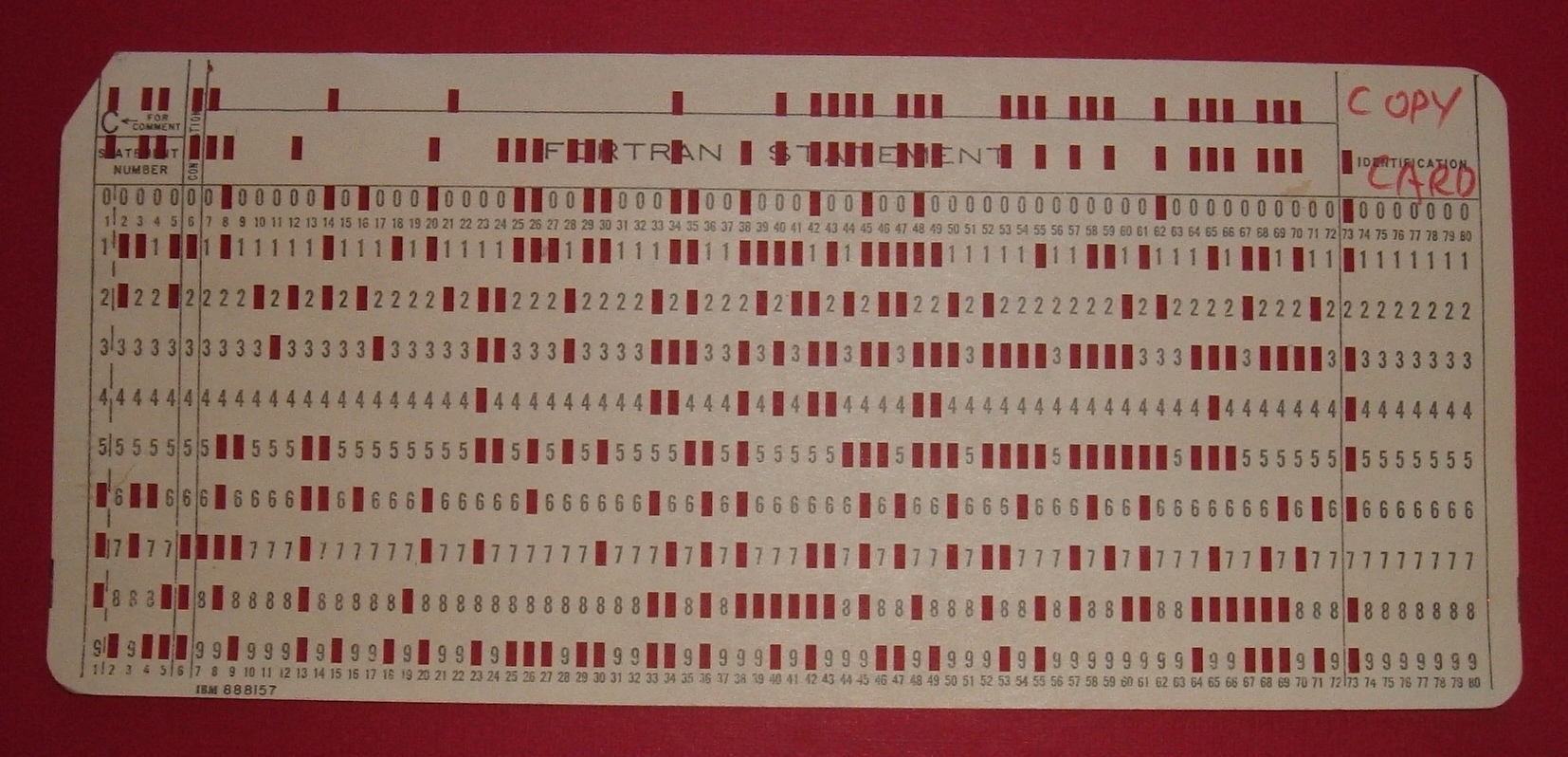
Binary punched card

For some computer applications, binary formats were used, where each hole represented a single binary digit (or "bit"), every column (or row) is treated as a simple bit field, and every combination of holes is permitted.

For example, on the IBM 701 and IBM 704, card data was read, using an IBM 711, into memory in row binary format. For each of the 12 rows of the card, 72 of the 80 columns, skipping the other 8, would be read into two 36-bit words, requiring 864 bits to store the whole card; a control panel was used to select the 72 columns to be read. Software would translate this data into the desired form. One convention was to use columns 1 through 72 for data, and columns 73 through 80 to sequentially number the cards, as shown in the picture above of a punched card for FORTRAN. Such numbered cards could be sorted by machine so that if a deck was dropped, the sorting machine could be used to arrange it back in order. This convention continued to be used in FORTRAN, even in later systems where the data in all 80 columns could be read.

The IBM card readers 3504, 3505 and the multifunction unit 3525 used a different encoding scheme for column binary data, also known as card image, where each column, split into two rows of 6 (12–3 and 4–9) was encoded into two 8-bit bytes, holes in each group represented by bits 2 to 7 (MSb numbering, bit 0 and 1 unused) in successive bytes. This required 160 8-bit bytes, or 1280 bits, to store the whole card.

As an aid to humans who had to deal with the punched cards, the IBM 026 and later 029 and 129 key punch machines could print human-readable text above each of the 80 columns.

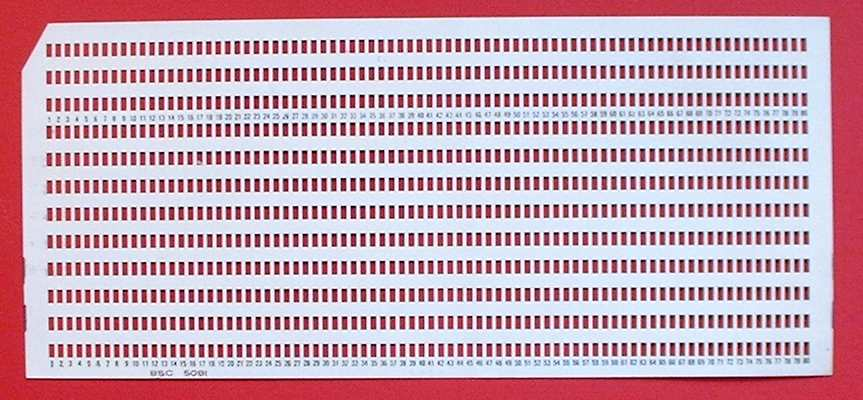
Invalid "lace cards" such as this pose mechanical problems for card readers.

As a prank, punched cards could be made where every possible punch position had a hole. Such "lace cards" lacked structural strength and would frequently buckle and jam inside the machine.

The IBM 80-column punched card format dominated the industry, becoming known as just IBM cards, even though other companies made cards and equipment to process them.

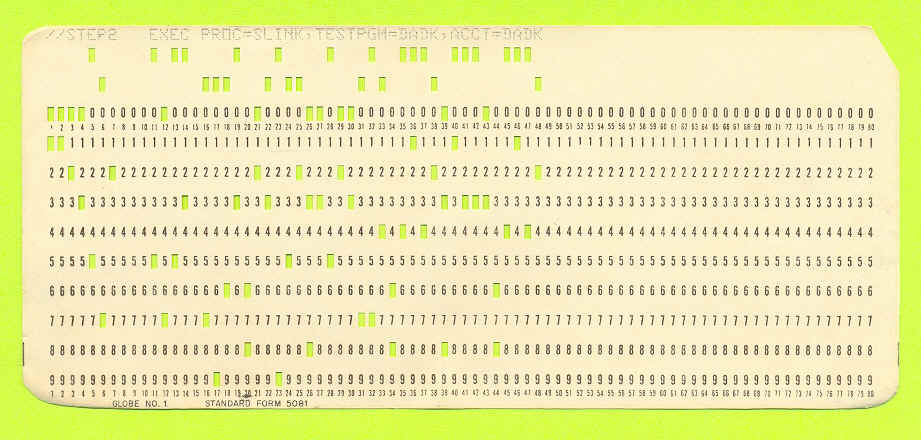
A 5081 card from a non-IBM manufacturer

One of the most common punched-card formats is the IBM 5081 card format, a general-purpose layout with no field divisions. This format has digits printed on it corresponding to the punch positions of the digits in each of the 80 columns. Other punched-card vendors manufactured cards with this same layout and number.

=== IBM Stub card and Short card formats ===
Long cards were available with a scored stub on either end, which, when torn off, left an 80-column card. The torn-off card is called a stub card.

80-column cards were available scored, on either end, creating both a short card and a stub card when torn apart. Short cards can be processed by other IBM machines. A common length for stub cards was 51 columns. Stub cards were used in applications requiring tags, labels, or carbon copies.

=== IBM 40-column Port-A-Punch card format ===
According to the IBM Archive: IBM's Supplies Division introduced the Port-A-Punch in 1958 as a fast, accurate means of manually punching holes in specially scored IBM punched cards. Designed to fit in the pocket, Port-A-Punch made it possible to create punched card documents anywhere. The product was intended for "on-the-spot" recording operations—such as physical inventories, job tickets and statistical surveys—because it eliminated the need for preliminary writing or typing of source documents.

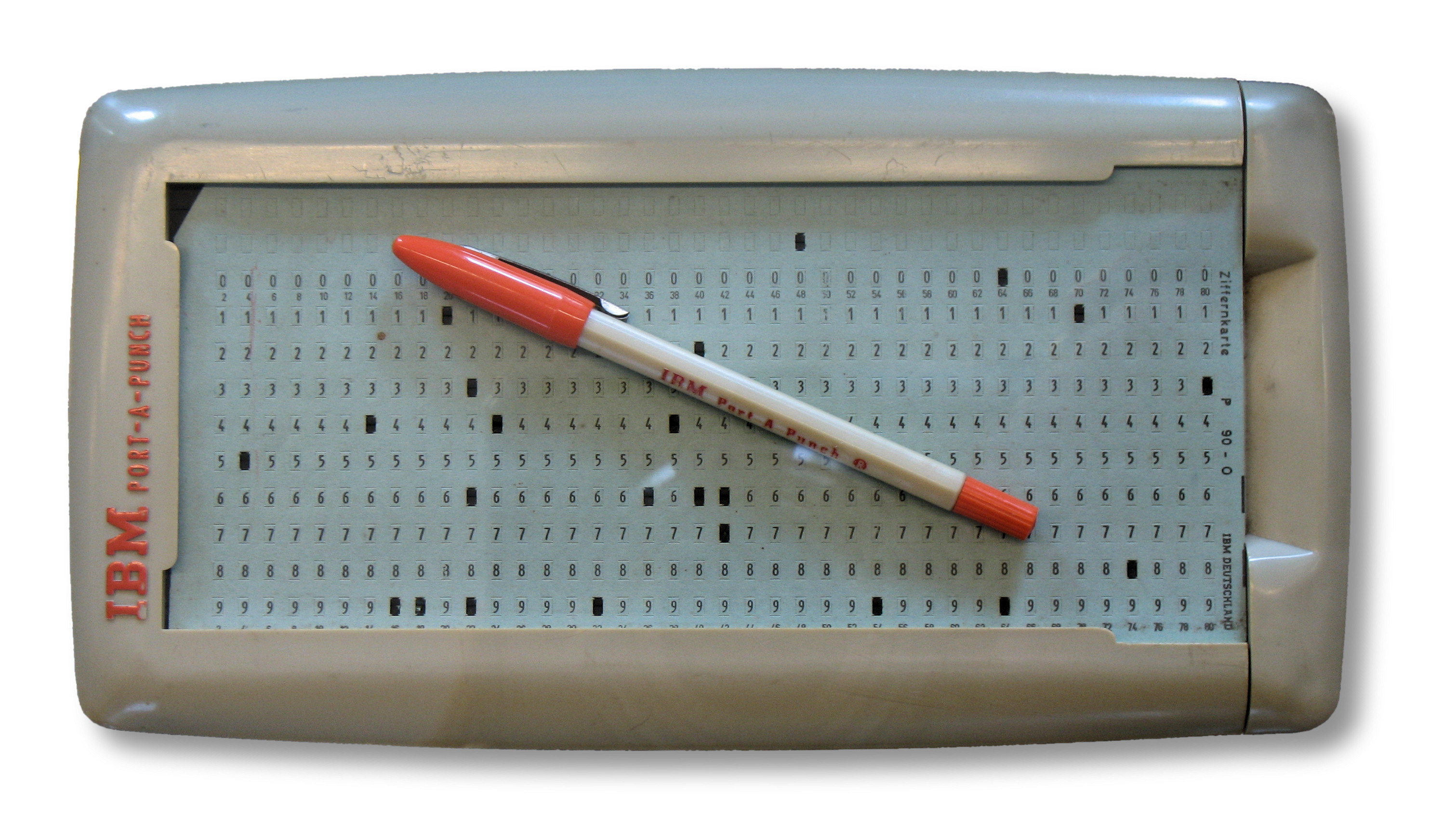
IBM Port-A-Punch

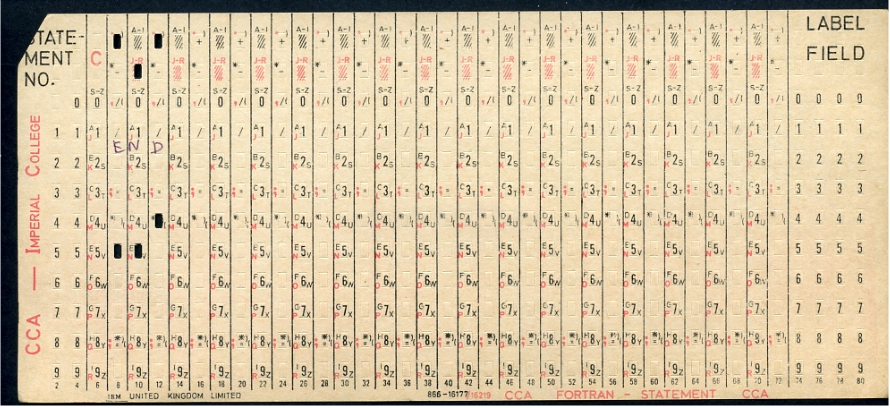
FORTRAN Port-A-Punch card. Compiler directive "SQUEEZE" removed the alternating blank columns from the input.

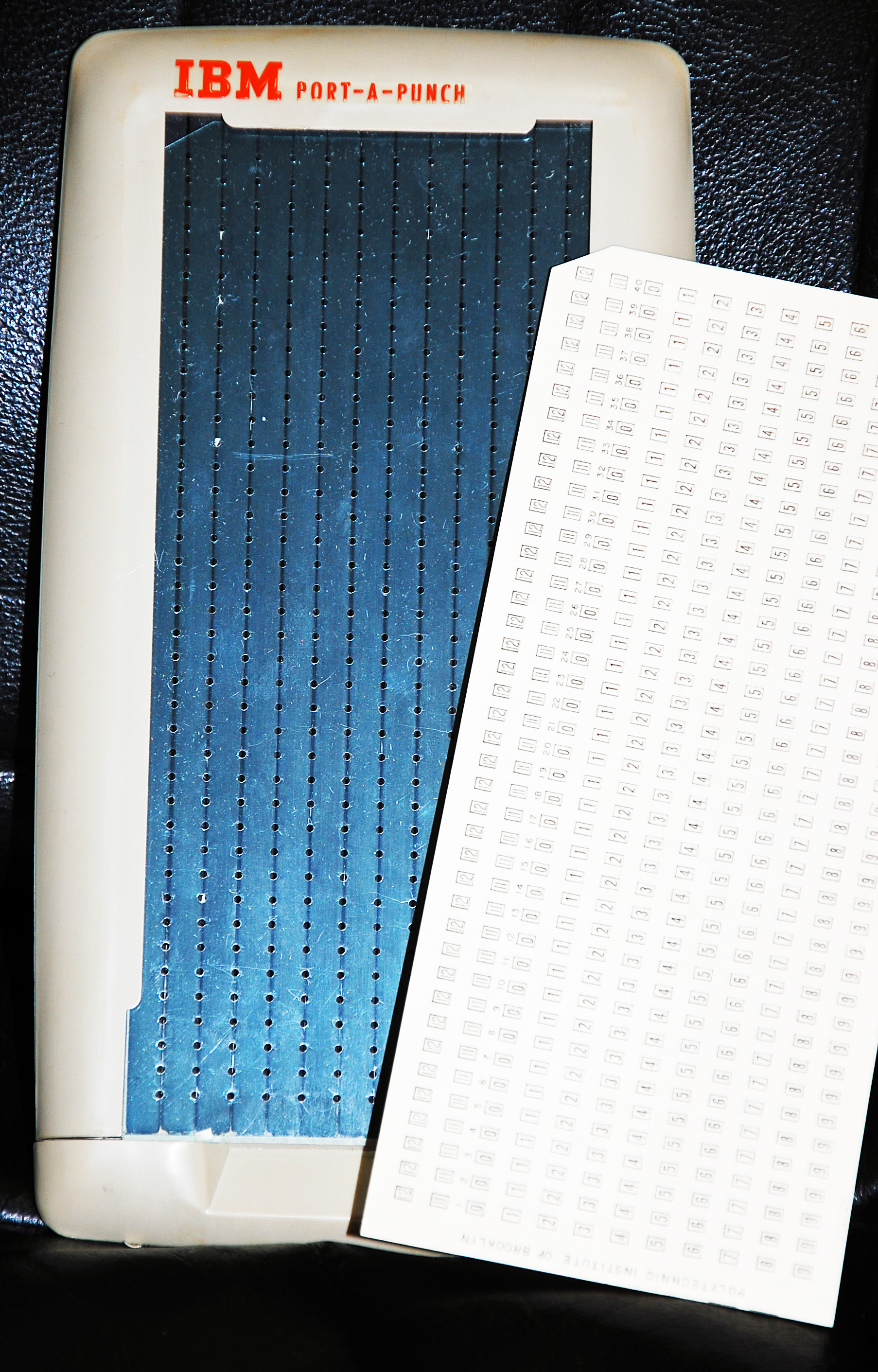
Port-a-punch

=== IBM 96-column format ===
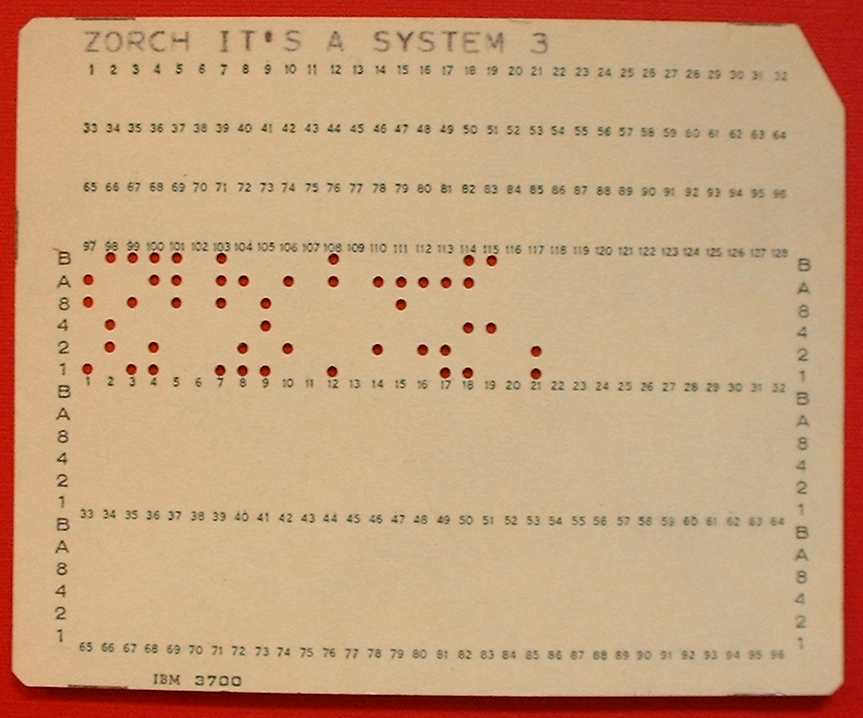
IBM 96-column punched card

In 1969 IBM introduced a new, smaller, round-hole, 96-column card format along with the IBM System/3 low-end business computer. These cards have tiny, 1 mm diameter circular holes, smaller than those in paper tape. Data is stored in 6-bit BCD, with three rows of 32 characters each, or 8-bit EBCDIC. In this format, each column of the top tiers are combined with two punch rows from the bottom tier to form an 8-bit byte, and the middle tier is combined with two more punch rows, so that each card contains 64 bytes of 8-bit-per-byte binary coded data. As in the 80 column card, readable text was printed in the top section of the card. There was also a fourth row of 32 characters that could be printed. This format was never widely used; it was IBM-only, but they did not support it on any equipment beyond the System/3, where it was quickly superseded by the 1973 IBM 3740 Data Entry System using 8-inch floppy disks.

The format was however recycled in 1978 when IBM re-used the mechanism in its IBM 3624 ATMs as print-only receipt printers.

=== Powers/Remington Rand/UNIVAC 90-column format ===
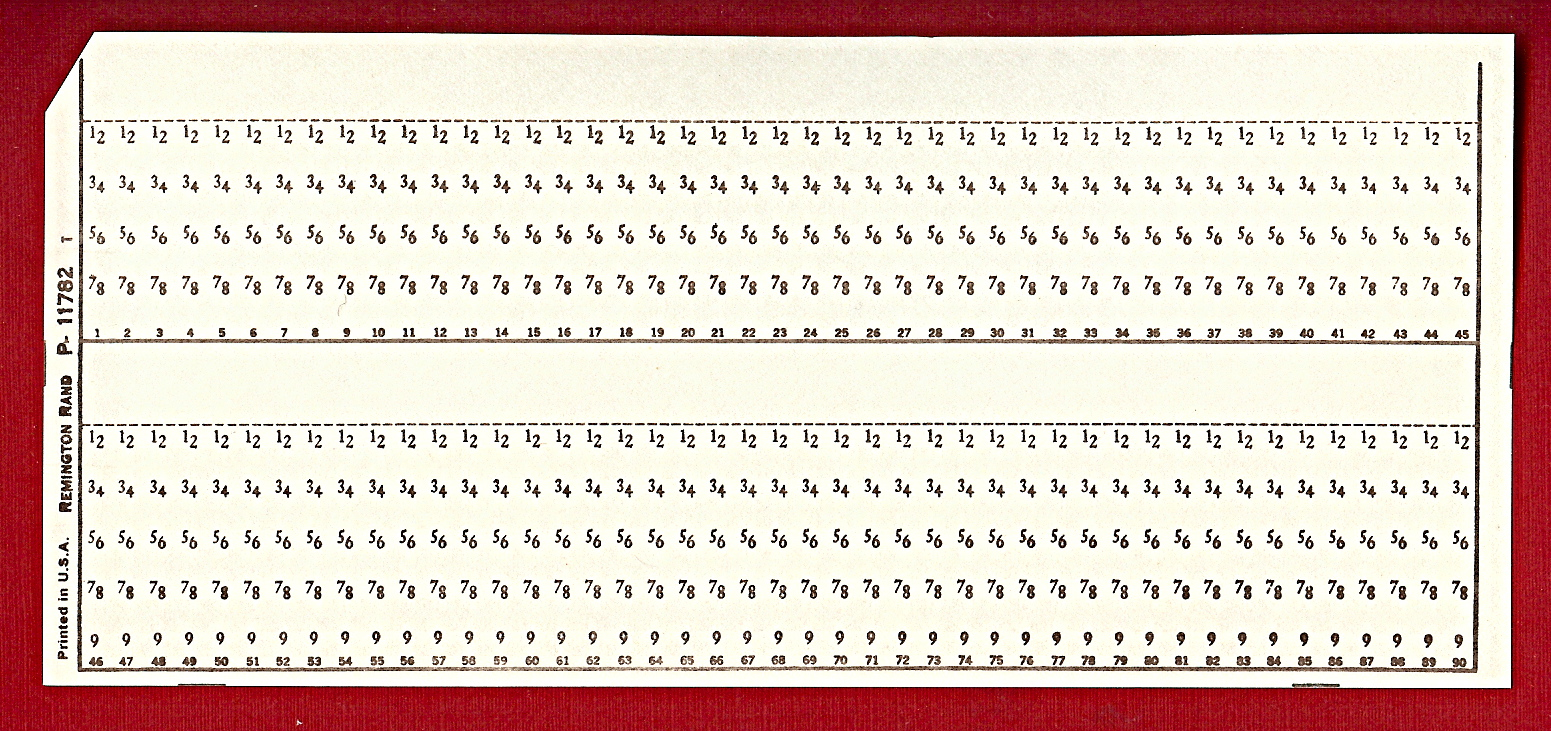
A blank Remington Rand UNIVAC format card

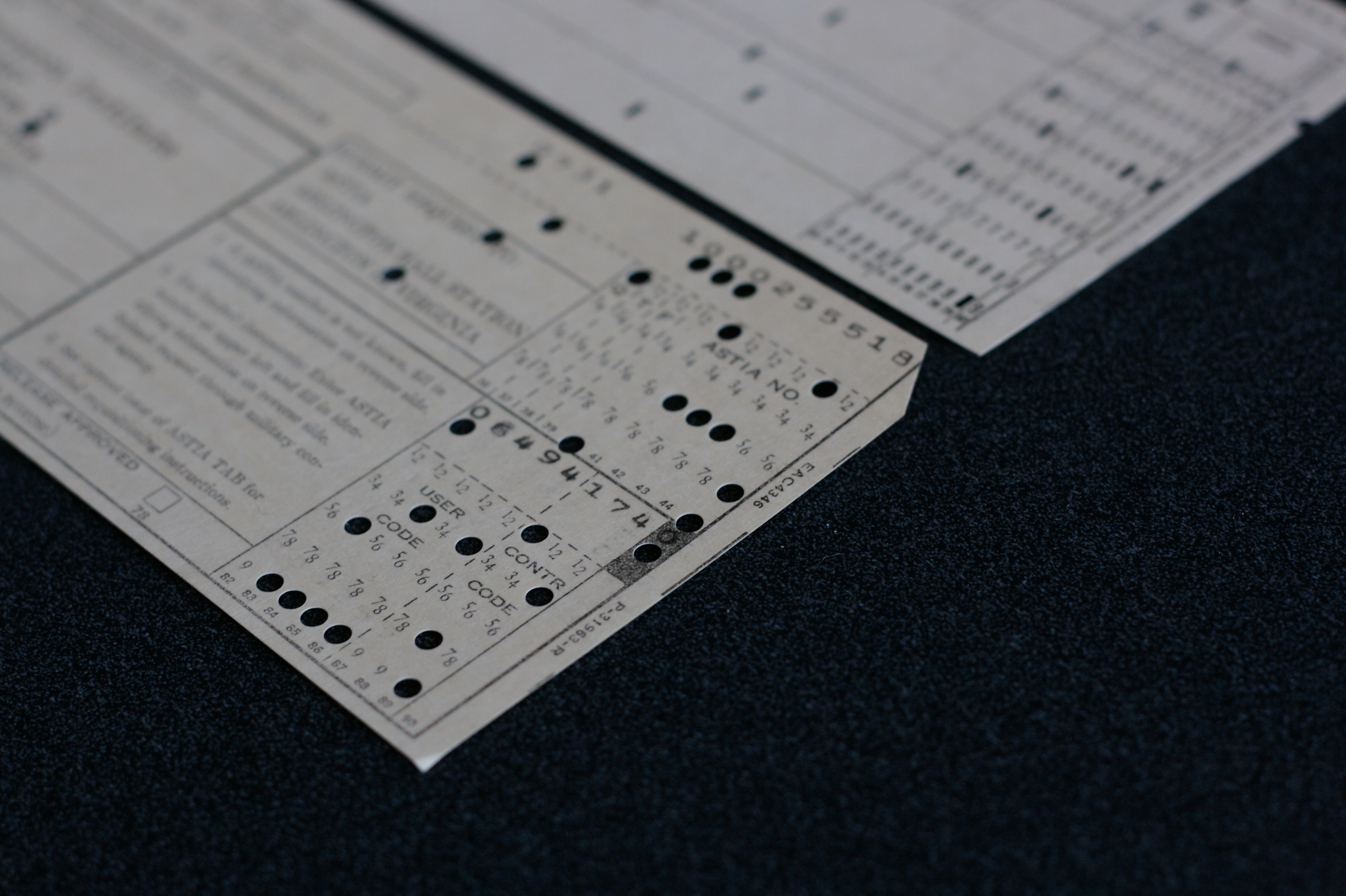
A punched Remington Rand card with an IBM card for comparison

The Powers/Remington Rand card format was initially the same as Hollerith's: 45 columns and round holes. In 1930, Remington Rand leap-frogged IBM's 80-column format from 1928 by coding two characters in each of the 45 columns – producing what is now commonly called the 90-column card. There are two sets of six rows across each card. The rows in each set are labeled 0, 1/2, 3/4, 5/6, 7/8 and 9. The even numbers in a pair are formed by combining that punch with a 9 punch. Alphabetic and special characters use three or more punches.

=== Powers-Samas formats ===
The British Powers-Samas company used a variety of card formats for their unit record equipment. They began with 45 columns and round holes. Later 36-, 40- and 65-column cards were provided. A 130-column card was also available – formed by dividing the card into two rows, each row with 65 columns and each character space with five punch positions. A 21-column card was comparable to the IBM Stub card.

=== Mark sense format ===
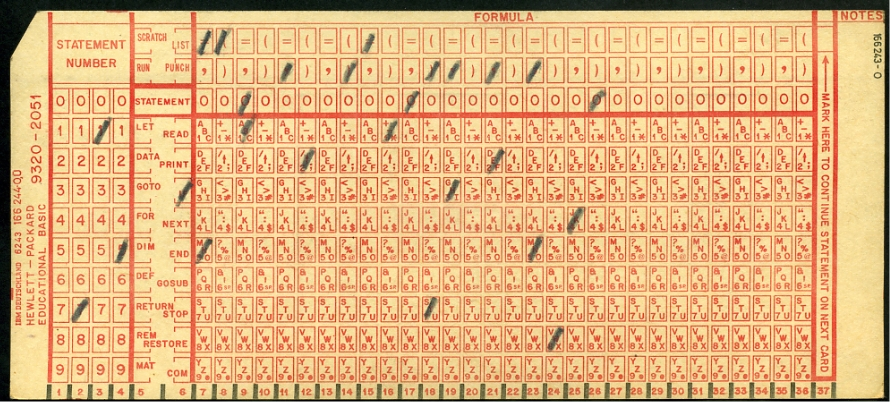
HP Educational Basic optical mark-reader card

Mark sense (electrographic) cards, developed by Reynold B. Johnson at IBM, have printed ovals that could be marked with a special electrographic pencil. Cards would typically be punched with some initial information, such as the name and location of an inventory item. Information to be added, such as quantity of the item on hand, would be marked in the ovals. Card punches with an option to detect mark sense cards could then punch the corresponding information into the card.

=== Aperture format ===
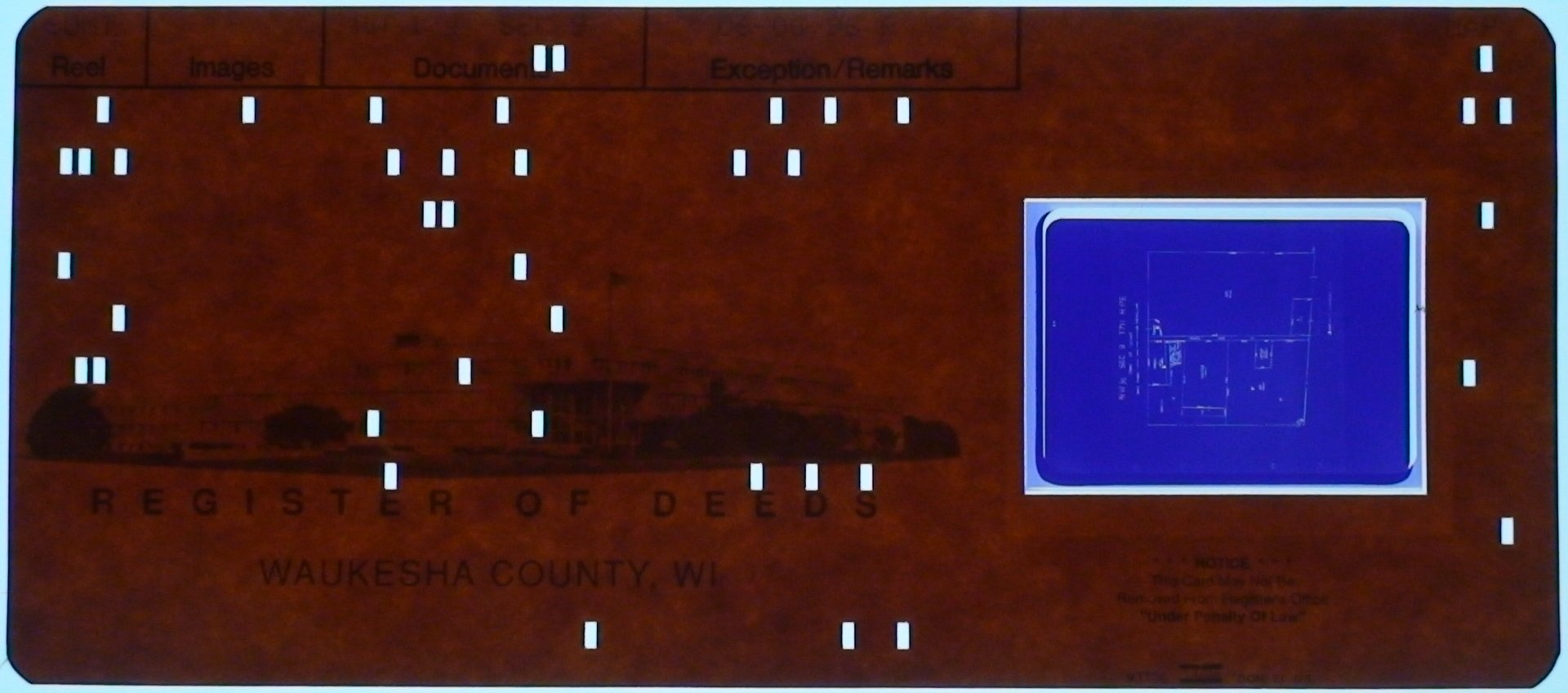
Aperture card

Aperture cards have a cut-out hole on the right side of the punched card. A piece of 35 mm microfilm containing a microform image is mounted in the hole. Aperture cards are used for engineering drawings from all engineering disciplines. Information about the drawing, for example the drawing number, is typically punched and printed on the remainder of the card.

== Manufacturing ==
Institutions, such as universities, often had their general purpose cards printed with a logo. A wide variety of forms and documents were printed on punched cards, including checks. Such printing did not interfere with the operation of the machinery.

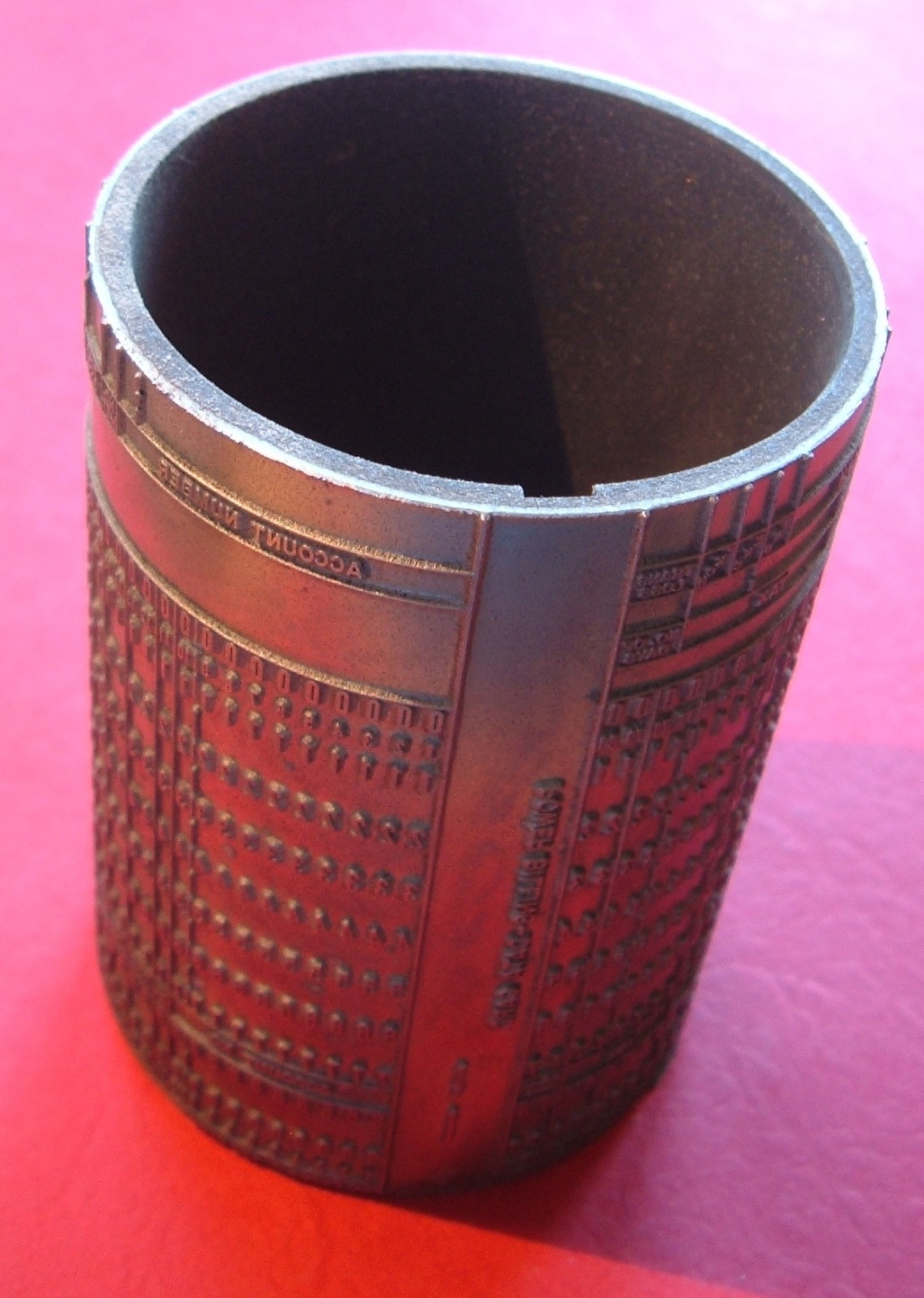
A punched card printing plate.

IBM's Fred M. Carroll developed a series of rotary presses that were used to produce punched cards, including a 1921 model that operated at 460 cards per minute (cpm). In 1936 he introduced a completely different press that operated at 850 cpm. Carroll's high-speed press, containing a printing cylinder, revolutionized the company's manufacturing of punched cards. It is estimated that between 1930 and 1950, the Carroll press accounted for as much as 25 percent of the company's profits.

Discarded printing plates from these card presses, each printing plate the size of an IBM card and formed into a cylinder, often found use as desk pen/pencil holders, and even today are collectible IBM artifacts (every card layout had its own printing plate).

In the mid-1930s a box of 1,000 cards cost $1.05 (equivalent to $25 in 2025).

== Cultural impact ==
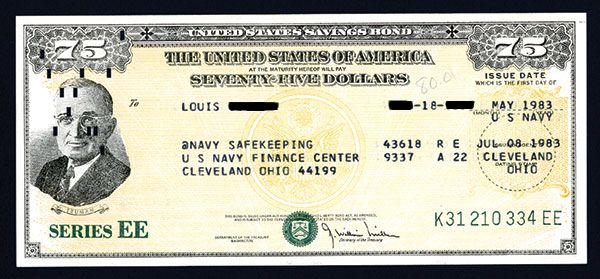
A $75 U.S. Savings Bond, Series EE issued as a punched card. Eight of the holes record the bond serial number.

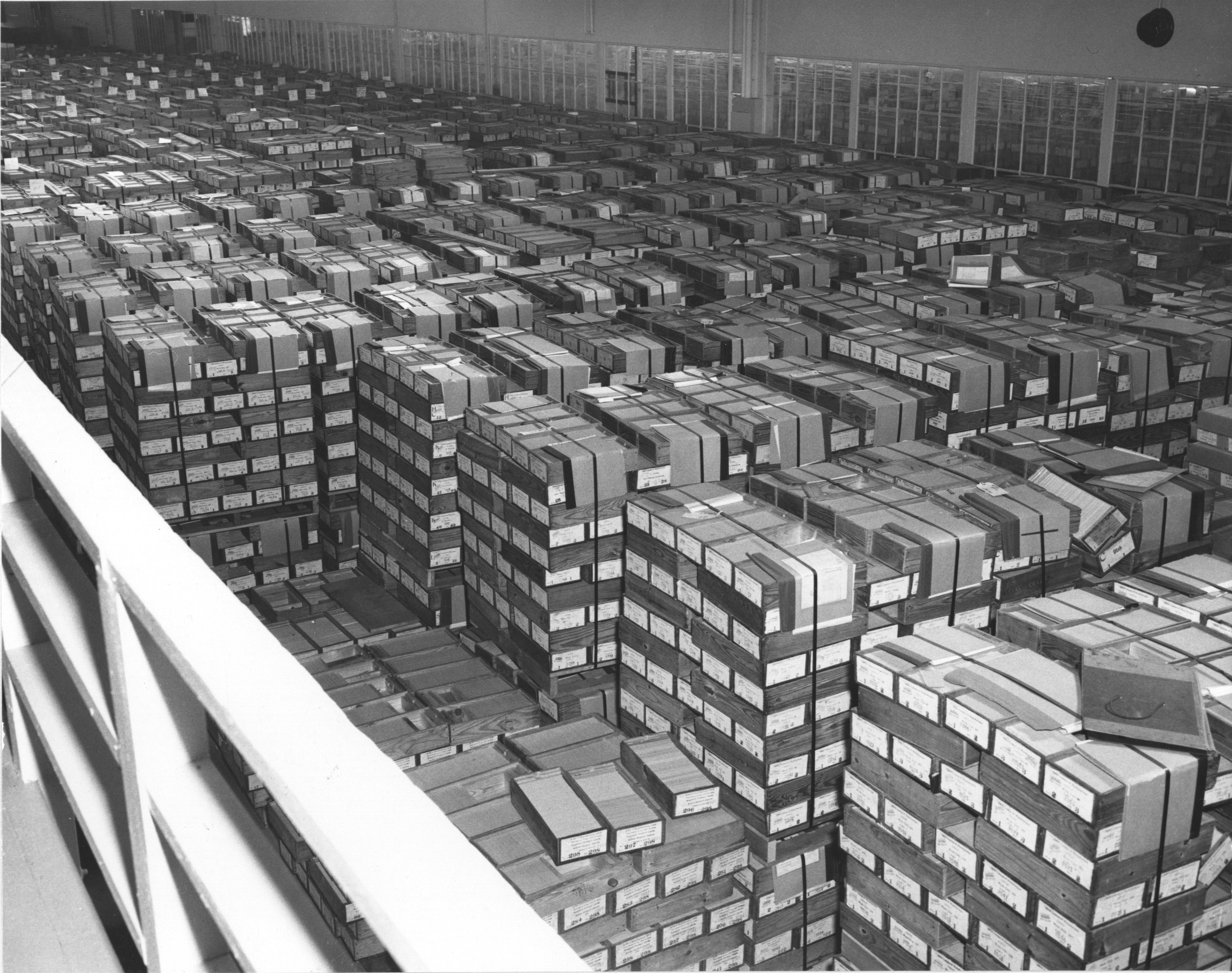
Cartons of punched cards stored in a United States National Archives Records Service facility in 1959. Each carton could hold 2,000 cards.

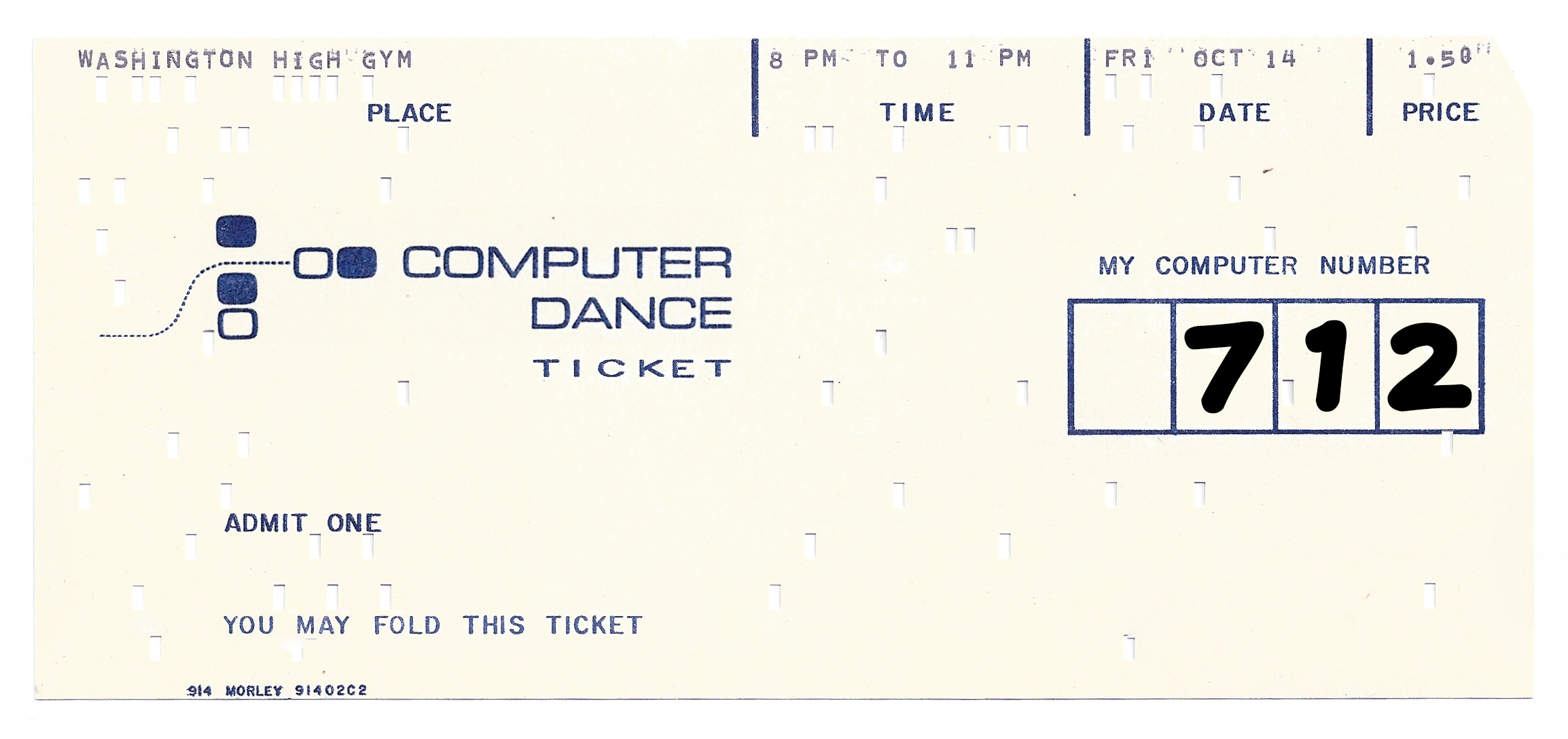
Punched card used as ticket for Computer Dance.

While punched cards have not been widely used for generations, the impact was so great for most of the 20th century that they still appear from time to time in popular culture. For example:

- Accommodation of people's names: The Man Whose Name Wouldn't Fit
- Artist and architect Maya Lin in 2004 designed a public art installation at Ohio University, titled "Input", that looks like a punched card from the air.
- Tucker Hall at the University of Missouri – Columbia features architecture that is rumored to be influenced by punched cards. Although there are only two rows of windows on the building, a rumor holds that their spacing and pattern will spell out "M-I-Z beat k-U!" on a punched card, making reference to the university and state's rivalry with neighboring state Kansas.
- At the University of Wisconsin – Madison, the exterior windows of the Engineering Research Building were modeled after a punched card layout, during its construction in 1966.
- At the University of North Dakota in Grand Forks, a portion of the exterior of Gamble Hall (College of Business and Public Administration), has a series of light-colored bricks that resembles a punched card spelling out "University of North Dakota."
- In the 1964–1965 Free Speech Movement, punched cards became a

metaphor... symbol of the "system"—first the registration system and then bureaucratic systems more generally ... a symbol of alienation ... Punched cards were the symbol of information machines, and so they became the symbolic point of attack. Punched cards, used for class registration, were first and foremost a symbol of uniformity. .... A student might feel "he is one of out of 27,500 IBM cards" ... The president of the Undergraduate Association criticized the University as "a machine ... IBM pattern of education."... Robert Blaumer explicated the symbolism: he referred to the "sense of impersonality... symbolized by the IBM technology."...

— Steven Lubar

- A legacy of the 80 column punched card format is that a display of 80 characters per row was a common choice in the design of character-based terminals. As of September 2014, some character interface defaults, such as the command prompt window's width in Microsoft Windows, remain set at 80 columns and some file formats, such as FITS, still use 80-character card images. The two-line element set format for tracking objects in Earth orbit is based on punch cards.
- In Arthur C. Clarke's early short story "Rescue Party", the alien explorers find a "... wonderful battery of almost human Hollerith analyzers and the five thousand million punched cards holding all that could be recorded on each man, woman and child on the planet". Writing in 1946, Clarke, like almost all SF authors, had not then foreseen the development and eventual ubiquity of the computer.
- In Philip K. Dick's 1956 novelette "The Minority Report", convicts predicted by Precogs are printed in punched cards.
- In "I.B.M.", the final track of her album This Is a Recording, comedian Lily Tomlin gives instructions that, if followed, would purportedly shrink the holes on a punch card (used by AT&T at the time for customer billing), making it unreadable.

=== Do Not Fold, Spindle or Mutilate ===
A common example of the requests often printed on punched cards which were to be individually handled, especially those intended for the public to use and return is "Do Not Fold, Spindle or Mutilate" (in the UK "Do not bend, spike, fold or mutilate"). Coined by Charles A. Phillips, it became a motto for the post–World War II era and was widely mocked and satirized. Some 1960s students at Berkeley wore buttons saying: "Do not fold, spindle or mutilate. I am a student". At least one punched-card issuer offered a reprieve: the 1966 Computer Dance ticket informed students: "YOU MAY FOLD THIS TICKET." The motto was also used for a 1970 book by Doris Miles Disney with a plot based around an early computer dating service and a 1971 made-for-TV movie based on that book, and a similarly titled 1967 Canadian short film Do Not Fold, Staple, Spindle or Mutilate.

== Standards ==
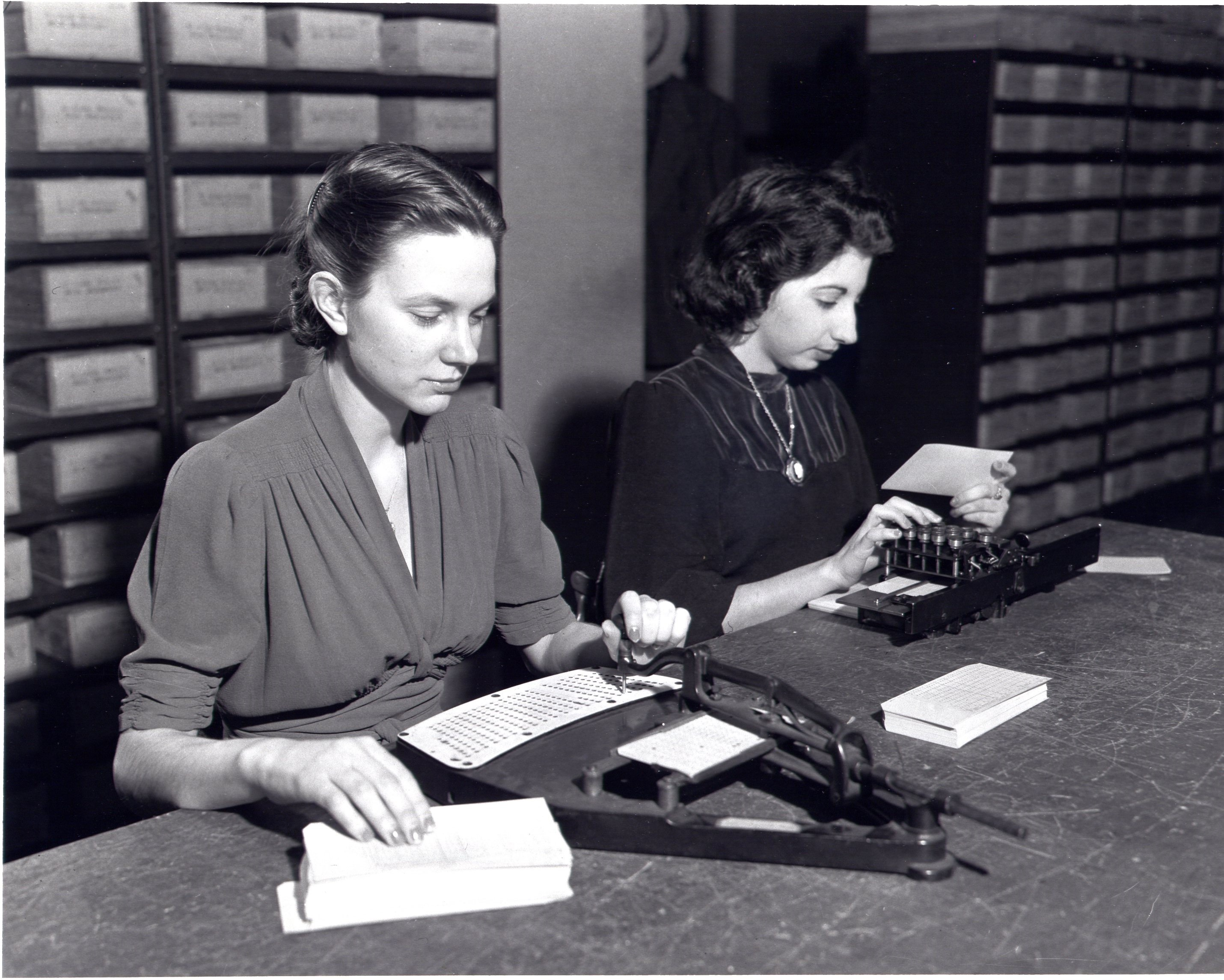
A U.S. Census Bureau clerk (left) prepares punch cards using a pantograph similar to that developed by Herman Hollerith for the 1890 Census, while a second clerk (right) uses a 1930s key punch to perform the same task more quickly.

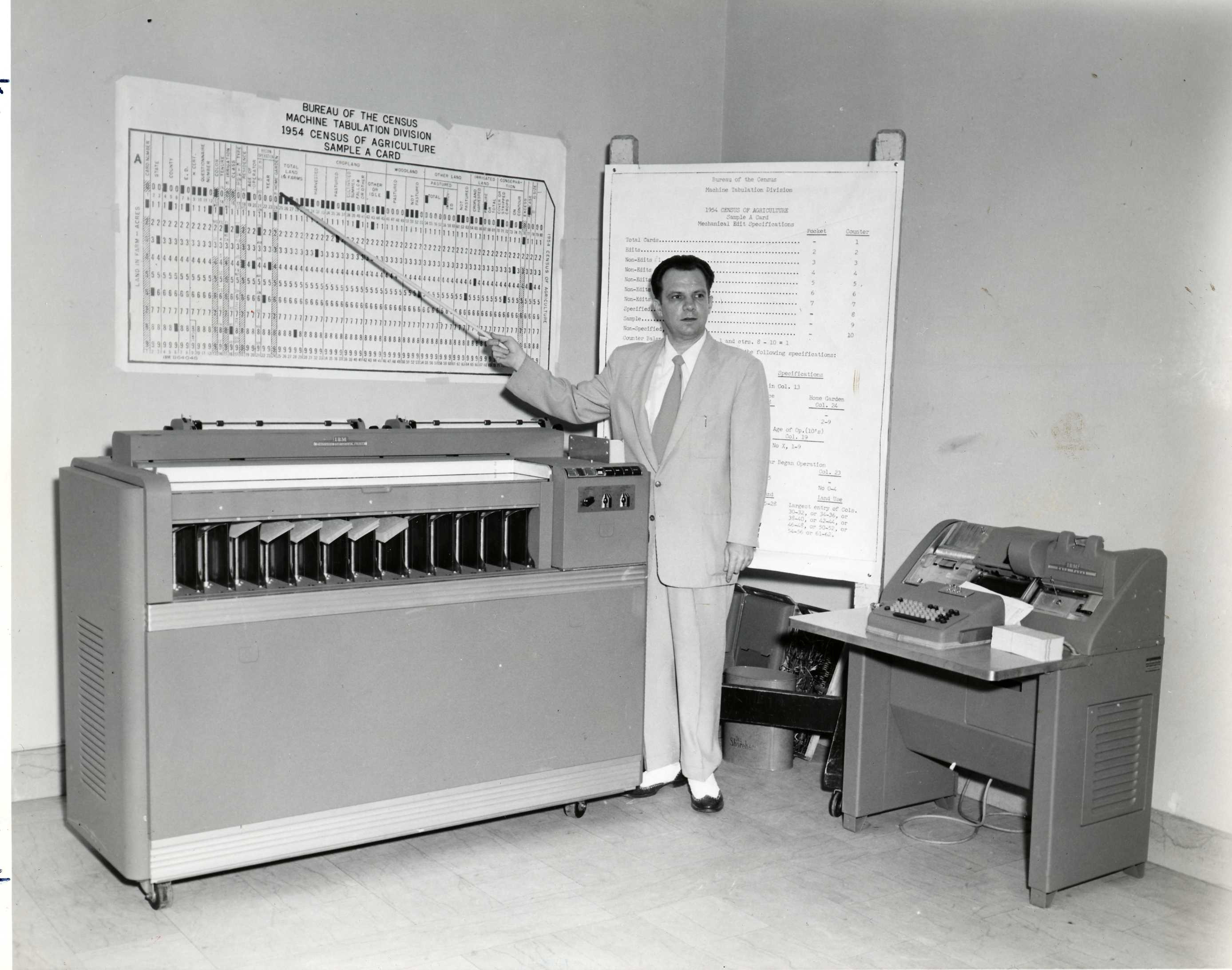
A wall-sized display sample of a punch card for the 1954 U.S. Census of Agriculture

- ANSI INCITS 21-1967 (R2002), Rectangular Holes in Twelve-Row Punched Cards (formerly ANSI X3.21-1967 (R1997)) Specifies the size and location of rectangular holes in twelve-row 3 1/4-inch-wide (83 mm) punched cards.
- ANSI X3.11-1990 American National Standard Specifications for General Purpose Paper Cards for Information Processing
- ANSI X3.26-1980 (R1991) Hollerith Punched Card Code
- ISO 1681:1973 Information processing – Unpunched paper cards – Specification
- ISO 6586:1980 Data processing – Implementation of the ISO 7-bit and 8-bit coded character sets on punched cards. Defines ISO 7-bit and 8-bit character sets on punched cards as well as the representation of 7-bit and 8-bit combinations on 12-row punched cards. Derived from, and compatible with, the Hollerith code, ensuring compatibility with existing punched-card files.

== Punched-card devices ==
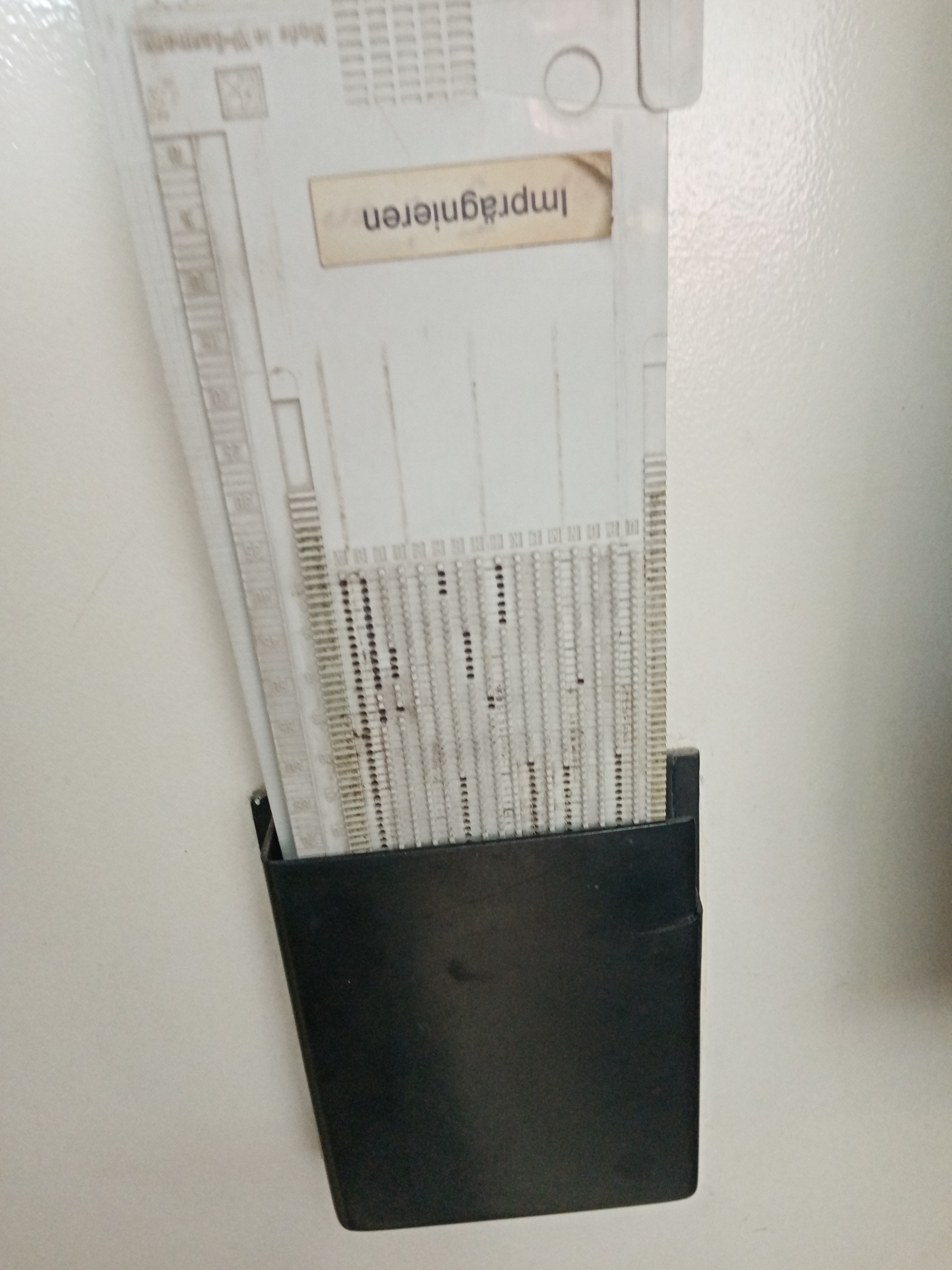
Punched cards used to program a dry-cleaning machine

Processing of punched cards was handled by a variety of machines, including:

- Keypunches – machines with a keyboard that punched cards from operator-entered data.
- Unit record equipment – machines that process data on punched cards. Employed prior to the widespread use of digital computers. Includes card sorters, tabulating machines and a variety of other machines.
- Computer punched-card reader – a computer input device used to read executable computer programs and data from punched cards under computer control. Card readers, found in early computers, could read up to 100 cards per minute, while traditional "high-speed" card readers could read about 1,000 cards per minute.
- Computer card punch – a computer output device that punches holes in cards under computer control.
- Voting machines – last used during the 2014 US election.

== See also ==
- Aperture card
- Book music
- Card image
- Computer programming in the punched card era
- Edge-notched card
- History of computing hardware
- Kimball tag—punched card price tags
- Paper data storage
- Punched card input/output
- Punched tape
- Lace card
