= Kimball tag =

Retail tag that can be read like a punch card

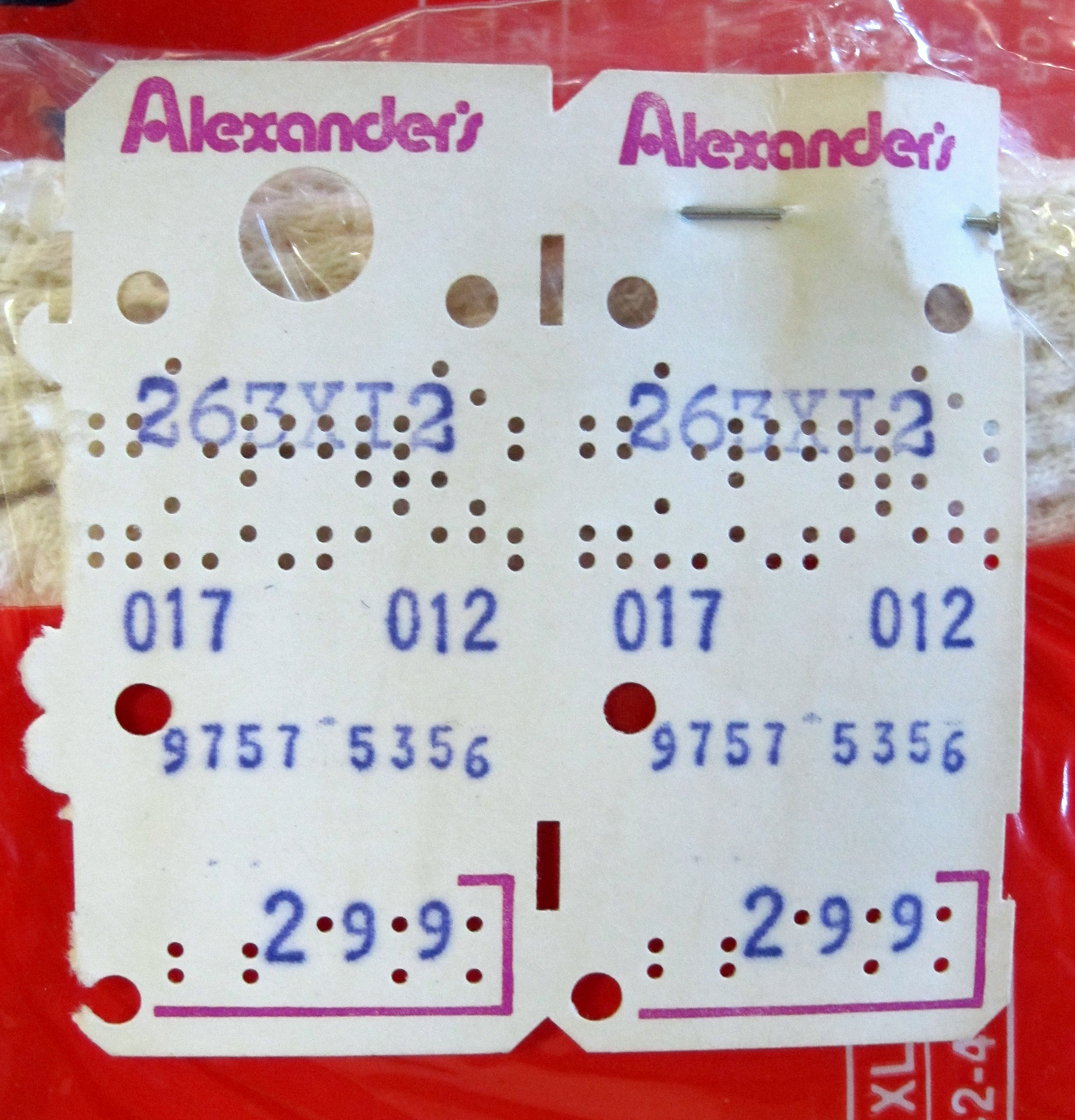
A Kimball tag pinned to a package of thermal underwear sold by Alexander's department store.

A Kimball tag was a cardboard tag that included both human- and machine-readable data to support punched card processing. A Kimball tag was an early form of stock control label that, like its later successor the barcode, supported back office data processing functions. They were predominantly used by the retail clothing ("fashion") industry.

Tagging guns which use plastic toggles to attach price tags to clothing are still known as "Kimball guns" (or the corruption, "kimble guns"), although the tags now use bar codes.

== History ==
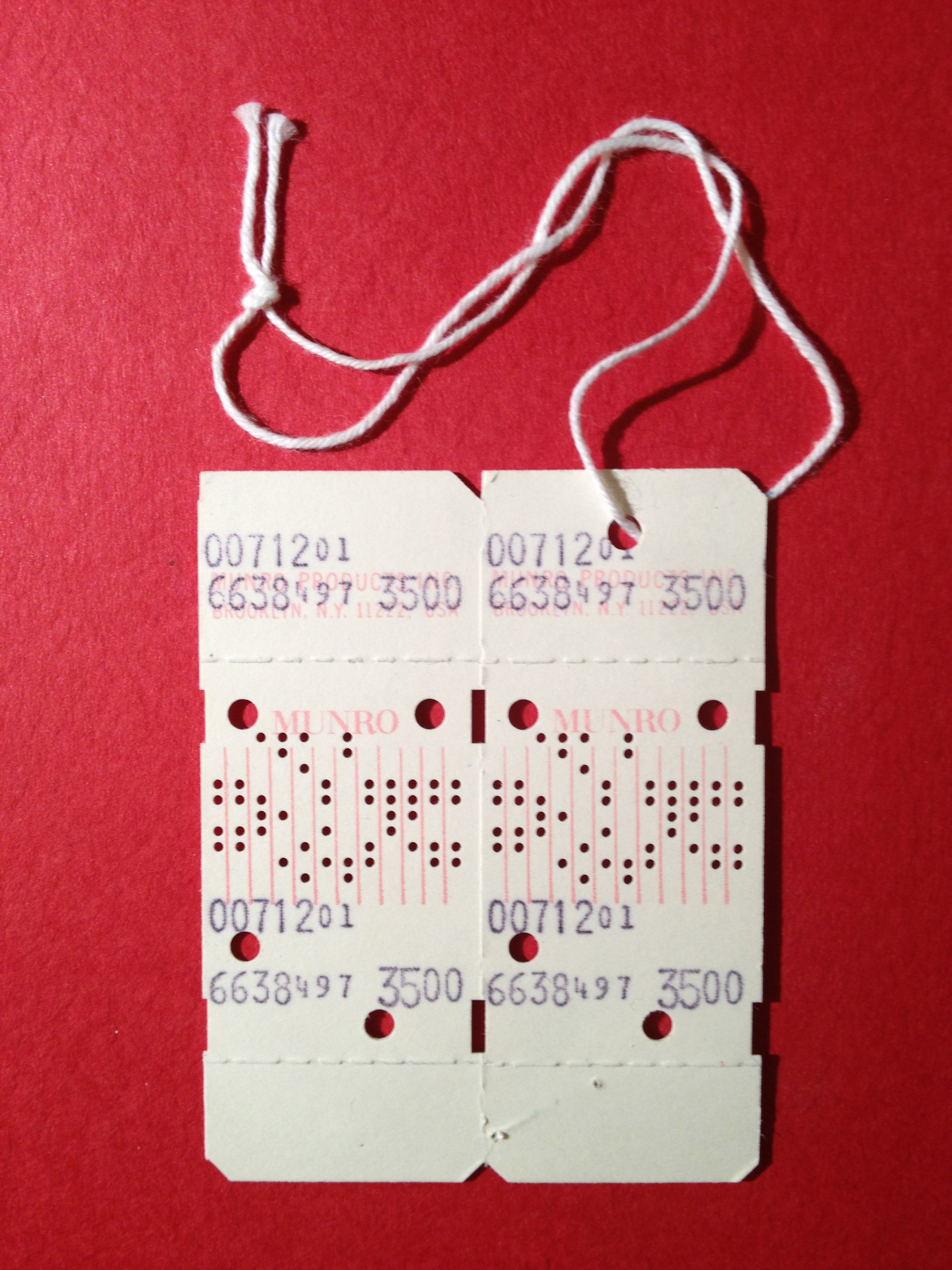
Coded hang tag from 1970.

Sears, Roebuck & Company sponsored the development of a specialized punched card system to track garment inventory, produce timely management reports, and reduce clerical errors. A pilot system was operational in 1952.

The A. Kimball Company, an established price tag manufacturer in New York City, and the Karl J. Braun Engineering Company of Stamford, Connecticut developed the garment tags and the machine that marked and punched them.

The Potter Instrument Company of Great Neck, New York developed a photoelectric tag reader for the 1952 pilot system. The reader scanned 100 tags per minute. A lens system enlarged the image of a tag's holes projected by a gas-type photoflash tube onto an array of phototubes. The phototubes fired thyratrons that activated relay logic to translate the tag's coded digits into Hollerith code and punch a standard sized punched card.
