= Spike (journalism) =

Journalism term

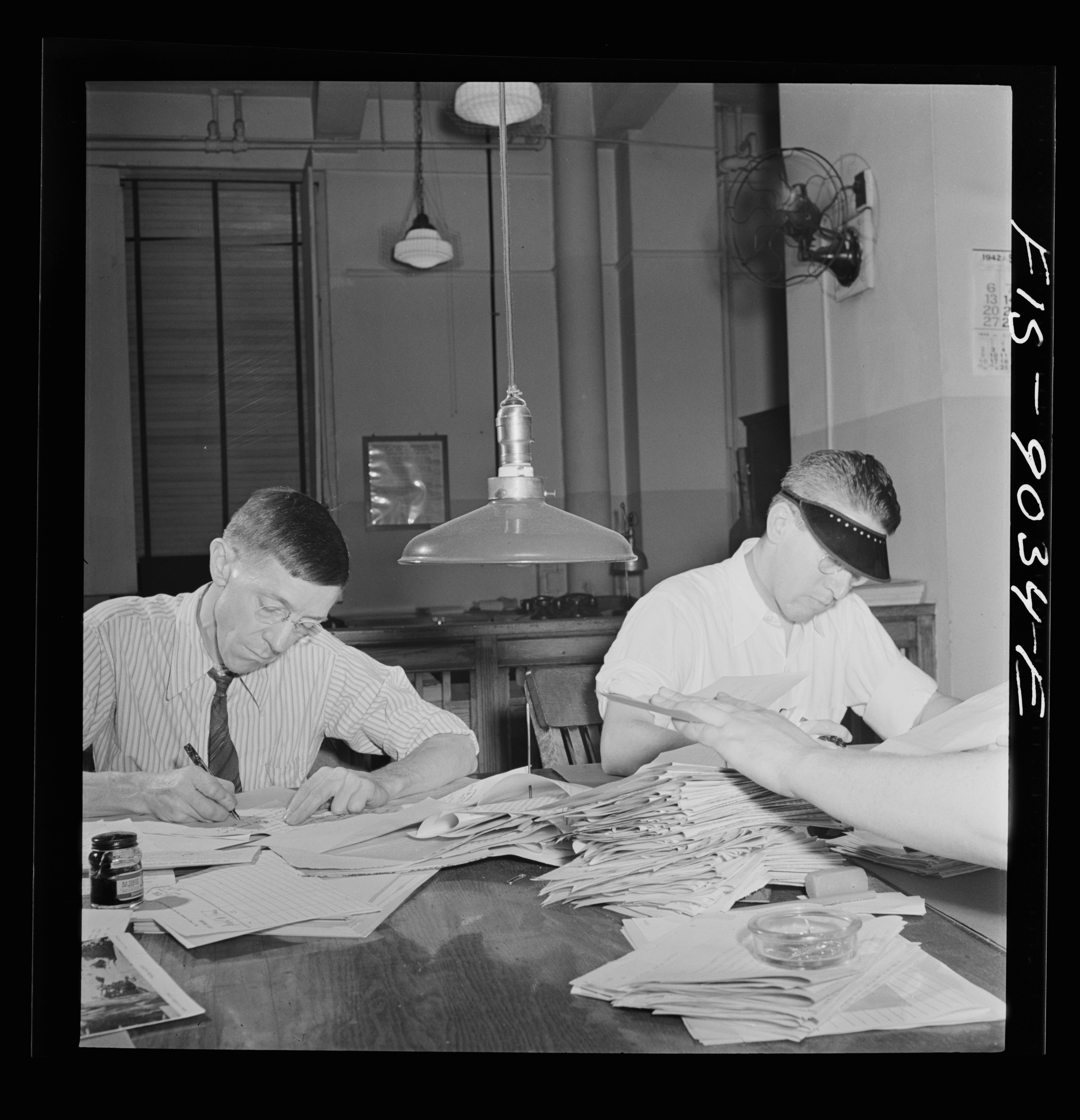
View of the New York Times newsroom, showing a spike with discarded documents on it (1942)

Spiking, in journalism, is the act of withholding a story from publication for editorial, commercial, or political reasons. A spiking may be permanent or temporary depending on what instigated it and whether the objection(s) can be overcome. The term "spike" originally referred to a metal spike (spindle) on journalists' or copy editors' desks, upon which they would impale rejected stories. Although the term comes from print media, radio, television and online publications also spike stories for the same reasons.

Some examples would be stories that, while factually correct, would likely displease a powerful local politician, upset a valuable advertiser in that paper, or bring unwanted attention to a community. The editorial staff or, if preempted, the newspaper ownership or management must balance all their interests against purely theoretical "journalistic integrity". Conflicts involving spiking often arise from stories being pursued as part of investigative journalism, which may attract SLAPP letters and libel suits (which can prove expensive to fight even if groundless).
