= Card image =

String that represents the content of a computer punch card

Card image is a traditional term for a character string, usually 80 characters in length, that was, or could be, contained on a single punched card. IBM cards were 80 characters in length. UNIVAC cards were 90 characters in length. Card image files stored on magnetic tape or disk were usually used for simulated card input or output.

A punched card typically held multiple data fields, some numeric, some alphabetic. Many data formats, such as the FITS image file format, still use card images as basic building blocks—even though punched cards are now mostly obsolete.
