= Spindle (stationery) =

Spike used to hold papers for processing

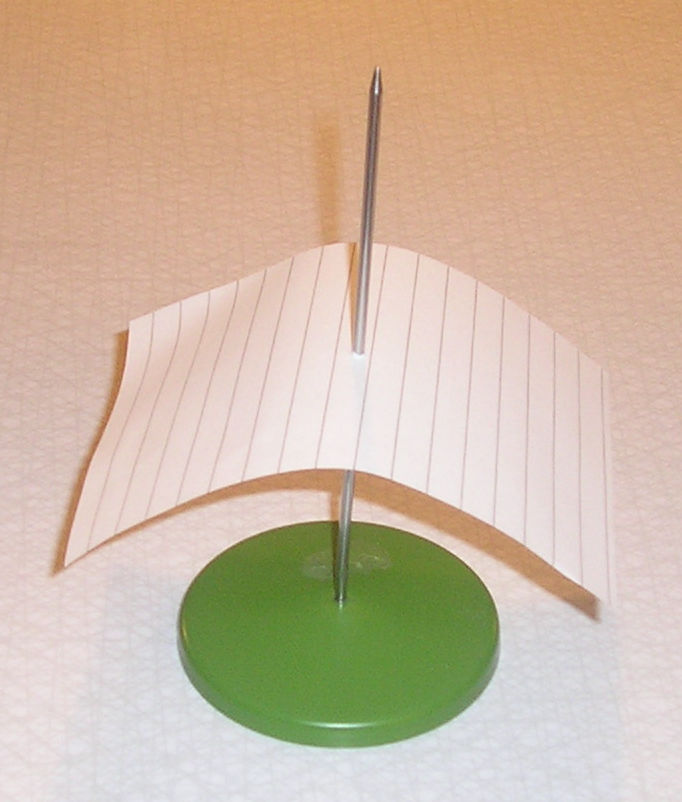
A spindled paper

A spindle (or colloquially, a spike) is an upright spike used to temporarily hold papers. "Spindling" or "spiking" is the act of spearing an item onto the spike. A spindle was often used in restaurants to hold orders from the waitstaff to the kitchen.

Depending on what sort of records were on a spindle, a string could be put through the holes to bundle the papers together, and the bundle stored.

The journalistic term to "spike" an article refers to one that ends up spindled on an editor's desk rather than forwarded for publication, typically for reasons other than mere copyedits.

Spindling was the middle of three stern prohibitions in the famous injunction historically printed on punched card documents to be processed by a computer: "Do not fold, spindle, or mutilate".

The word processor Microsoft Word contains a "spike" function, named after this tool, which allows to cut several text fragments from a document in sequence (as if stacking them on a notional "spike"), then paste them all together into another spot.
