= Potter Instrument =

American computer hardware company

Potter Instrument Company
- Company type: Public
- Industry: Computer
- Founded: 1942; 83 years ago in Long Island, New York, United States
- Founder: John Taft Potter
- Defunct: c. 1979
- Fate: Bankruptcy dissolution
- Number of employees: 1,500 (1970s, peak)

Potter Instrument Company was a public American computer hardware company active from 1942 to the late 1970s and based in Long Island. It was founded by John Taft Potter (1911–1987), an inventor of electronic instruments and magnetic computer storage devices. The company was the first to market a random-access mass storage device with interchangeable media in 1957.

== History ==
Potter Instrument Company was founded by John Taft Potter (1911–1987) in Long Island in 1942. The company initially produced a variety of electromechanical devices for enterprise recordkeeping, including a device that could accurately count up to 1,600,000 pieces of paper in around one second, before moving onto more advanced computer hardware that would become its forte.

In 1948, John T. Potter filed for a patent that describes a random access mass storage device working in three dimensions that uses steel wires as the recording medium. The patent was accepted in 1952, the same year the company announced their first linear tape drives. As described in the patent, the device comprises rows of the two-dimensional frames, onto which columns of the steel wires are suspended. A selector arm raises one of the frames, a read–write head slides and pivots onto a selected wire, and the wire is moved up and down to record data along it. The entire set of frames could be moved all at once and replaced with a different set, making it a pioneering removable storage device as well as an early mass-storage device. Potter with the help of George Comstock later tweaked the design to use half-inch magnetic tape (suspended in the frames using springs) instead of steel wire. He successfully marketed the device to the Univac Corporation in 1957. With this, the Potter Three-Dimensional Memory Device was the first magnetic random-access mass storage device with interchangeable media, predating the disk packs of the early 1960s and the first 8-inch floppy disks of the late 1960s. National Cash Register would later work upon the patent to create Card Random-Access Memory, or CRAM, which was much more commercially successful than Potter's own device.

Potter eventually pursued more traditional rotating disk drives in 1968 with the release of their DD4311 disk drive, plug-compatible with IBM's 2311 drive. Potter's disk drives were praised for being marginally faster than their IBM counterparts while costing far less. They would eventually become a major player in the mainframe and minicomputer hard drive market. Potter also specialized in data-entry terminals and chain printers.

At their peak in the 1970s, Potter was the largest computer company in Long Island, employing over 1,500 people across four plants. In the late 1960s the firm entered the computer rental business, leasing out IBM mainframes to large businesses, following in the footsteps of large players like Itel and Foxboro. This would eventually become Potter's undoing, as in 1971 IBM severely cut their leasing fees, reducing the demand for third-party lessor such as Potter. In 1972, the company posted a $13.1-million loss. John T. Potter resigned as president and COO in January 1973, while remaining CEO and chairman of the company. Two years later, in April 1975, Potter filed for Chapter 11 bankruptcy and shut down their Long Island operations.

While the bulk of Potter's facilities remained physically locked up amid bankruptcy proceedings, the company's 100-worker military products division continued to operate in spite of orders from above. In August 1975, the division was acquired by Jan Stenbeck, a 31-year-old businessman from Sweden, and rechristened Miltope Corporation. Miltope thrived off their military contracts and is still in business as of February 2024, while Potter dissolved sometime in the late 1970s, after John T. Potter had been ousted as chairman and CEO in 1978.
