= Everett Franklin Lindquist =

Everett Franklin Lindquist (June 4, 1901 – May 13, 1978) was a professor of education at the University of Iowa College of Education. He is best known as the creator of the ACT and other standardized tests. His contributions to the field of educational testing are significant and still evident today.

== Early life ==
Everett Franklin Lindquist was a native of Gowrie, Iowa. He was the son of Swedish-Americans Jonas A. Lindquist and Hannah O. Anderson. Lindquist was of Swedish descent, with ancestors from Jönköping county.

== Career ==
Lindquist joined the University of Iowa in 1925 as a research assistant. He received his Ph.D. in 1927 and was a member of the Iowa faculty until retirement in 1969. In 1953, he was elected as a Fellow of the American Statistical Association.

== Educational Testing ==
Desiring to create an academic competition for Iowa students, he developed a set of tests in 1929. These evolved into the Iowa Tests of Basic Skills, an exam for elementary and middle school students, as well as the Iowa Tests of Educational Development for high schoolers. Despite their name, they are used nationwide, especially since the enactment of No Child Left Behind legislation. Due to their success, he founded the not-for-profit Measurement Research Center on the Iowa campus to score these tests, which was later acquired by Westinghouse, NCS, and its present owner, Pearson PLC.

In 1959, he introduced the ACT, an examination to test students on practical knowledge rather than cognitive reasoning examined on the SAT. The ACT is still in widespread use today, and is headquartered in Lindquist's hometown, Iowa City, Iowa. Although it is now administered by the College Board, the competing organization to ACT, Lindquist developed the first National Merit Scholarship Qualifying Tests.

Lindquist was on the committee that developed the GED, which evolved during World War II as a way to grant academic credit to servicemen.

== Testing technology ==
As a result of the fast-growing use of ITBS tests, he developed the first practical optical mark recognition system as a replacement for the electrical mark sense IBM 805 Test Scoring Machine. Although many of his colleagues at the University of Iowa contributed to the invention, Lindquist is generally credited with this development and is the sole inventor listed on U.S. Patent 3,050,248 (Filed 1955, granted 1962).

Lindquist's first optical mark recognition scanner used a mimeograph paper-transport mechanism directly coupled to a magnetic drum memory. Although it was not a general purpose computer, it made extensive use of computer technology.

== Publications ==
His 1940 book, "Statistical Analysis in Educational Research", laid the groundwork for the need to interpret testing data in smaller settings using accessible means. He was the editor of the first edition of the then definitive work, Educational Measurement (1951) and contributed his own chapter outlining the problems and issues facing his field. These issues are still of great importance today. A second influential book, "Design and Analysis of Experiments in Psychology and Education" (1953), expounded on the ideas mentioned in his first book, cementing his authority as an expert on educational research.

== Legacy ==
The Lindquist Center, home to the University of Iowa College of Education, is currently on the University of Iowa campus and was named in his honor. Additionally, the Lindquist Building on the ACT campus in Iowa City also exists in his honor. He was also named one of Iowa City's "Fabulous 150" by the Iowa City Press Citizen.

In 1972 the American Educational Research Association created the E. F. Lindquist Award for worthy statisticians.

Although many classes now teach to his tests and ACT preparation is a multimillion-dollar industry, Lindquist discouraged teaching to the test – due to this problem, his competitions ended in the late 1930s.
