= National Educational Development Tests =

U.S. standardized tests

The National Educational Development Tests (NEDT) were standardized tests administered in the United States to students in Grades 7 to 10. The test system was developed by Science Research Associates in 1959, and applied from 1960 through to the early 1990s. The structure of the tests was based on the Iowa Tests of Educational Development (ITED) created by the University of Iowa College of Education in 1942 for use in Iowa, and comprised 20–40 minute timed sub-tests in five categories: English Usage, Mathematics Usage, Natural Sciences Reading, Social Studies Reading, and Word Usage. From 1970, revised editions of the test included an additional generalised Test of Learning Ability and a questionnaire for the student's own future educational plans.

The NEDT was advertised to school counselors as a measurement of student performance in preparation for college applications and as a predictor for college entrance test scores. In practice, while the test scores correlated strongly with high-school level performance, the link to academic success at the collegiate level was unproven. At their peak in the 1970s, 350,000 students took the tests each semester.

Even though the link to academic success at the collegiate level was unproven, the test proved to be very effective at revealing a number of students who scored very high on the test, but were actually working at a much lower level in class. With this information, counselors and teachers were able to work more closely with these underachieving students pointing them in the right direction for improving their grades in preparation for college.
