= Scantron Corporation =

American manufacturing company

Scantron
- Type: Private
- Predecessor: SCAN-TRON Tustin, CA.
- Founded: June 1972; 54 years ago
- Founder: William E. Sanders
- Headquarters: Eagan, Minnesota, United States
- Products: Various multiple-choice, bubble-marked answer sheets for exams/tests/quizzes, survey & ballot forms, various tally & results forms; OMR machines; standalone test scoring machines
- Parent: Regent LP
- Website: www.scantron.com

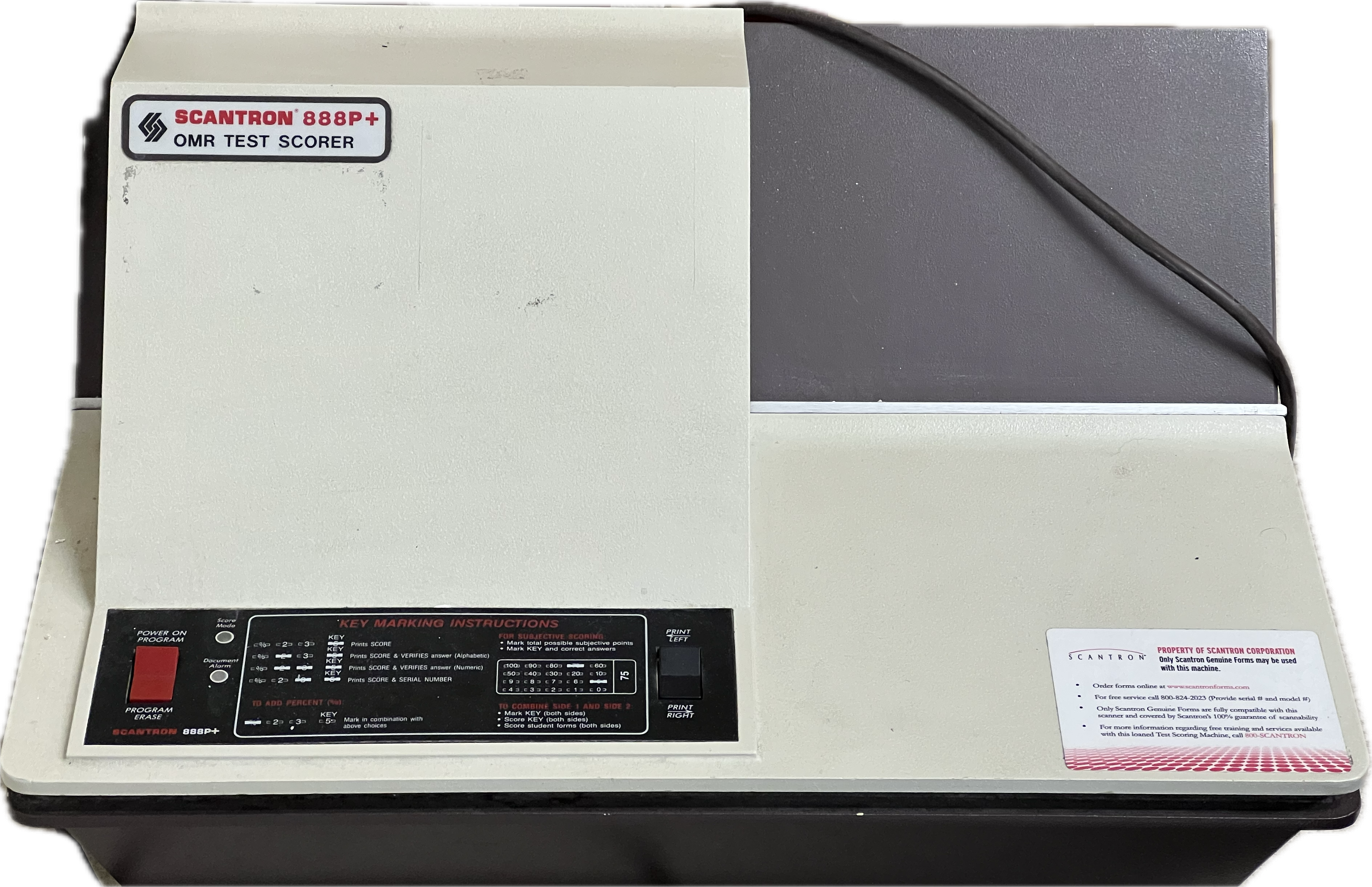
A Scantron 888P+ machine, used for testing in schools.

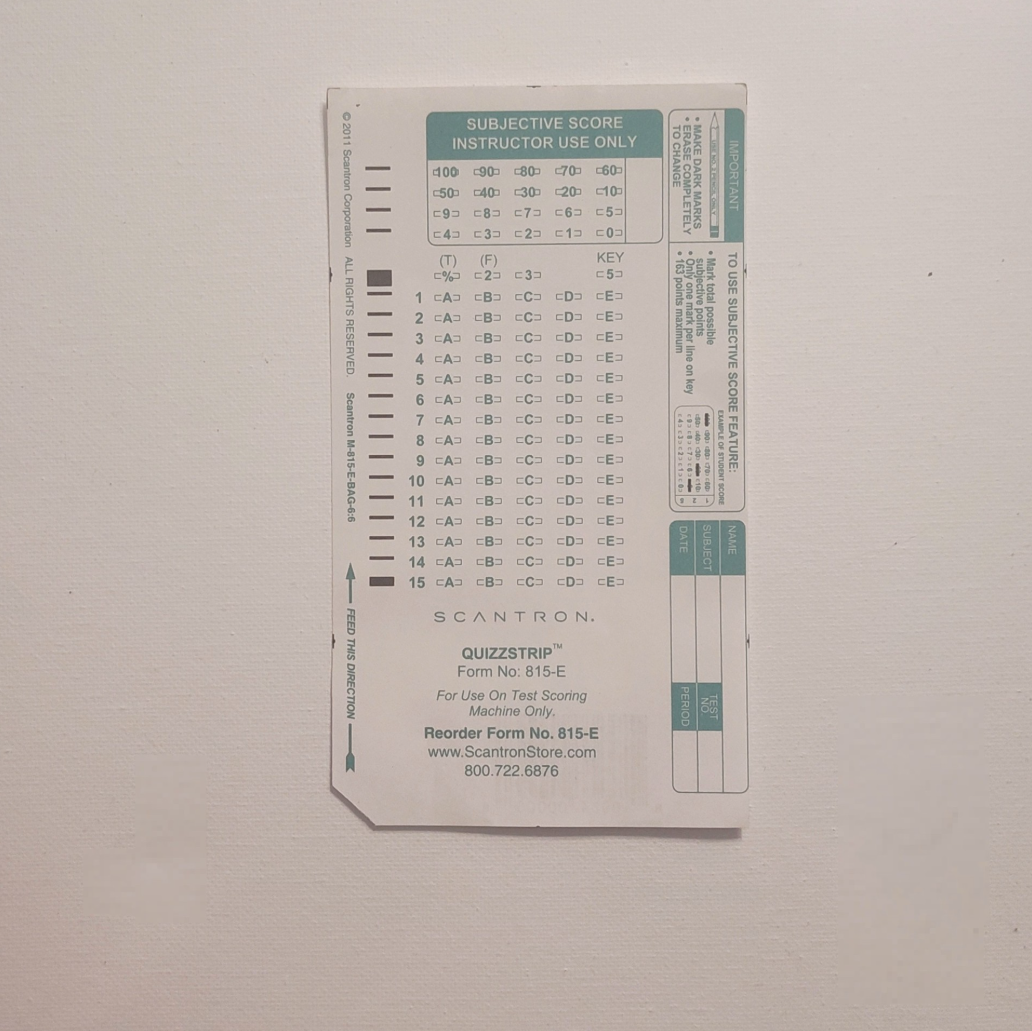
A Scantron form 815-E sheet for multiple-choice testing.

Scantron is an American company based in Eagan, Minnesota. Scantron provides assessment products and technology services for business, education, certification, and government clients.

Scantron Assessment Solutions deals with scanner manufacturing, forms printing, computer-based testing, and the creation of test questions by psychometricians. It operates in 98% of US school districts, 56 countries, 48 ministries of education, and 94 of the top 100 US universities. The company is well known for their machine-readable paper forms on which students mark answers to multiple-choice test questions and the optical mark recognition (OMR) and imaging scanners that read them. To analyze those answers, the machines use OMR- and image-based data collection software. In addition to its forms and scanners, Scantron provides web- and desktop-based assessment software, such as Performance Series.

Scantron Technology Solutions provides managed technology support for IT endpoints and devices. In 2022, Scantron acquired ServRight to further extend its technology capabilities.

Scantron was a member of the American Legislative Exchange Council (ALEC) from 2010 to 2012.

Scantron became wholly owned by Transom Capital Group in December 2019. In May 2023, The Technology Solutions division of Scantron rebranded itself as Secur-Serv. In August 2024, Regent LP acquired the Assessment Solutions division of Scantron from Transom, leaving Transom with Secur-Serv.

== See also ==
- Course evaluation
- Mark sense
- Optical character recognition
- Optical mark recognition
- Tabulating machine
