= Reynold B. Johnson =

American inventor and computer pioneer

- Born: July 16, 1906; Minnesota, US
- Died: September 15, 1998 (aged 92); Palo Alto, California, US
- Other name: Rey Johnson
- Education: University of Minnesota
- Occupations: Inventor, Computer pioneer
- Awards: Computer Pioneer Award(1987)

Reynold Benjamin Johnson (July 16, 1906 – September 15, 1998) was an American inventor and computer pioneer. A long-time employee of IBM, Johnson is said to be the "father" of the hard disk drive. Other inventions include automatic test scoring equipment and the videocassette tape.

== Early life, family and education ==
Reynold Johnson was born in Minnesota to Swedish immigrants. He had at least two brothers and a sister. He graduated from Minnehaha Academy in 1925, then attended University of Minnesota, obtaining his bachelor of science degree in Educational Administration in 1929.

== Career ==
Johnson was a high school science teacher in Michigan in 1932 when he invented an electronic test scoring machine that sensed pencil marks on a standardized form. IBM bought the rights to Reynold's invention and hired him as an engineer to work in their Endicott, New York laboratory. The test scoring machine was sold as the IBM 805 Test Scoring Machine beginning in 1937.

One of Reynold's early assignments was to develop technology that allowed cards marked with pencil marks to be converted into punched cards. That allowed punched card data to be recorded by people using only a pencil. That "mark sense" technology was widely used by businesses in the 1940s, 1950s, and 1960s. For example, the Bell System used mark sense technology to record long-distance calls, and utility companies used it to record meter readings. The US government used it under the name "electrographic" technology.

In 1952, IBM sent Johnson to San Jose, California, to create and manage its West Coast Laboratory. In 1956, a research team led by Johnson developed disk data storage technology, which IBM released as the IBM 350 disk storage unit. Although the first disk drive was crude by modern standards, it launched a multibillion-dollar industry.

Johnson was working with Sony on another project when he developed the prototype for a half-inch videocassette tape. Lou Stevens noted that "Sony was using wider tape on reels. He cut the tape to a half an inch, and put it in a cartridge. The larger tapes weren't easy enough for kids to use, and his interest was in education and building a video textbook for kids."

When Johnson retired from IBM in 1971, he had obtained more than 90 patents. After his retirement, he developed the microphonograph technology used in the Fisher-Price Talk to Me Books which won a Toy of the Year award. (Note: There are several organizations that name a Toy of the Year. The most likely award is the one presented at the North American International Toy Fair, but the source does not specify, and no other source has been found to confirm which one is meant.) The technology was also used by the National Audubon Society to aid bird watchers with songbird identification. Johnson received the National Medal of Technology and Innovation from President Ronald Reagan in 1986.

The IEEE Reynold B. Johnson Information Storage Systems Award was established in 1991, and is each year presented to a small team or an individual that has made outstanding contributions to information storage systems.

Johnson was awarded the Franklin Institute's Certificate of Merit in 1996.

== Personal life and demise ==
Johnson and his wife Beatrice had two sons and a daughter.

Johnson died in 1998, at age 92, of melanoma at Palo Alto, California.
