= Iowa Center for Assistive Technology Education and Research =

The Iowa Center for Assistive Technology Education and Research (ICATER) is an assistive technology and universal design resource for the education community in Iowa and the United States. The center, housed within the University of Iowa College of Education and the Lindquist Center in Iowa City, provides many services for educators such as pre-service training, latest technology tutorials, and summer institutes. Not only does ICATER help students with disabilities learn to their full potential, but it also has a lab that provides demonstrations of assistive technology.

== Student services ==
University students, K-12 students, and families throughout Iowa consult with ICATER staff to try technology such as software, apps, or alternative computer access. In August 2014, the University of Iowa College of Education hosted a two-day bootcamp called Talk-to-Text, to teach middle school students from Cedar Rapids, Iowa about software programs that could help them learn. The students learned about ‘Dragon Naturally Speaking’ and ‘Co-Writer.’
