= Science Research Associates =

U.S. educational publisher

- Parent company: McGraw-Hill Education
- Founded: 1938
- Country of origin: United States
- Headquarters location: New York City
- Official website: www.mheducation.com

Science Research Associates (SRA), founded by Lyle Spencer in 1938, was a Chicago-based publisher of educational materials and schoolroom reading comprehension products. The company was acquired by McGraw-Hill Education in the early 2000s.

== History ==
The company was founded in 1938. In 1950, Donald Henry Parker developed his multilevel reading product. In 1955, Parker proposed the product to Science Research Associates.

In 1957, the SRA Reading Laboratory Kit was first published, for individualized classroom instruction, that they translated to mathematics, science, and social studies commonly called SRA cards. The labs were large boxes filled with color-coded cardboard sheets, and each sheet included a reading exercise for students.

IBM purchased SRA in 1964. By this time, the company's line of primary- and secondary-school products had increased. Among the new products was the National Educational Development Tests, a series of standardized tests sold to schools as a method of testing students' likelihood of qualifying for college. SRA produced both IBM PC and Apple II software in the 1980s. Maxwell Communication Corporation bought SRA in 1988, and it became part of Macmillan/McGraw-Hill in 1989. Maxwell Communications collapsed, and McGraw-Hill acquired full ownership of Macmillan/McGraw-Hill and SRA.

== Educational programs ==
Since the 1960s, SRA has published Direct Instruction programs, also known as DISTAR (Direct Instruction System for Teaching Arithmetic and Reading). These include Language for Learning, Reading Mastery, Reasoning and Writing, Connecting Math Concepts, and Corrective Reading. SRA acquired Everyday Mathematics and purchased Open Court Reading in the 1990s.

In 1992, SRA joined with Gateway Educational Products, Ltd., so they can released the Read to Learn program, known as the SRA Reading Power program by Don H. Parker. We recommend that they should complete the Learn to Read product, known as the Hooked on Phonics program, before moving on to the SRA Reading Power program.

In the early 2000s, the company was purchased by McGraw-Hill Education. The brand name and products were made part of the PreK-12 business of the company. The Imagine It! reading program was launched in 2007. McGraw-Hill Education also competes as a publisher of mathematics and science materials with programs such as Real Math, Number Worlds and Snapshots Video Science.
