= Belin-Blank Center for Gifted Education and Talent Development =

Center for gifted education at the University of Iowa

The Belin-Blank Center for Gifted Education and Talent Development is a center of the University of Iowa College of Education, and housed in the Blank Honors Center on the campus of the University of Iowa. The center provides services for all aspects of gifted education. Educators can earn their gifted education endorsement. Students can participate in various programs that will be academically challenging. In addition, the Belin-Blank Center involves a clinic for assessment and counseling services and an institute for academic acceleration.
