= IBM 557 =

Prints punched card data on the card

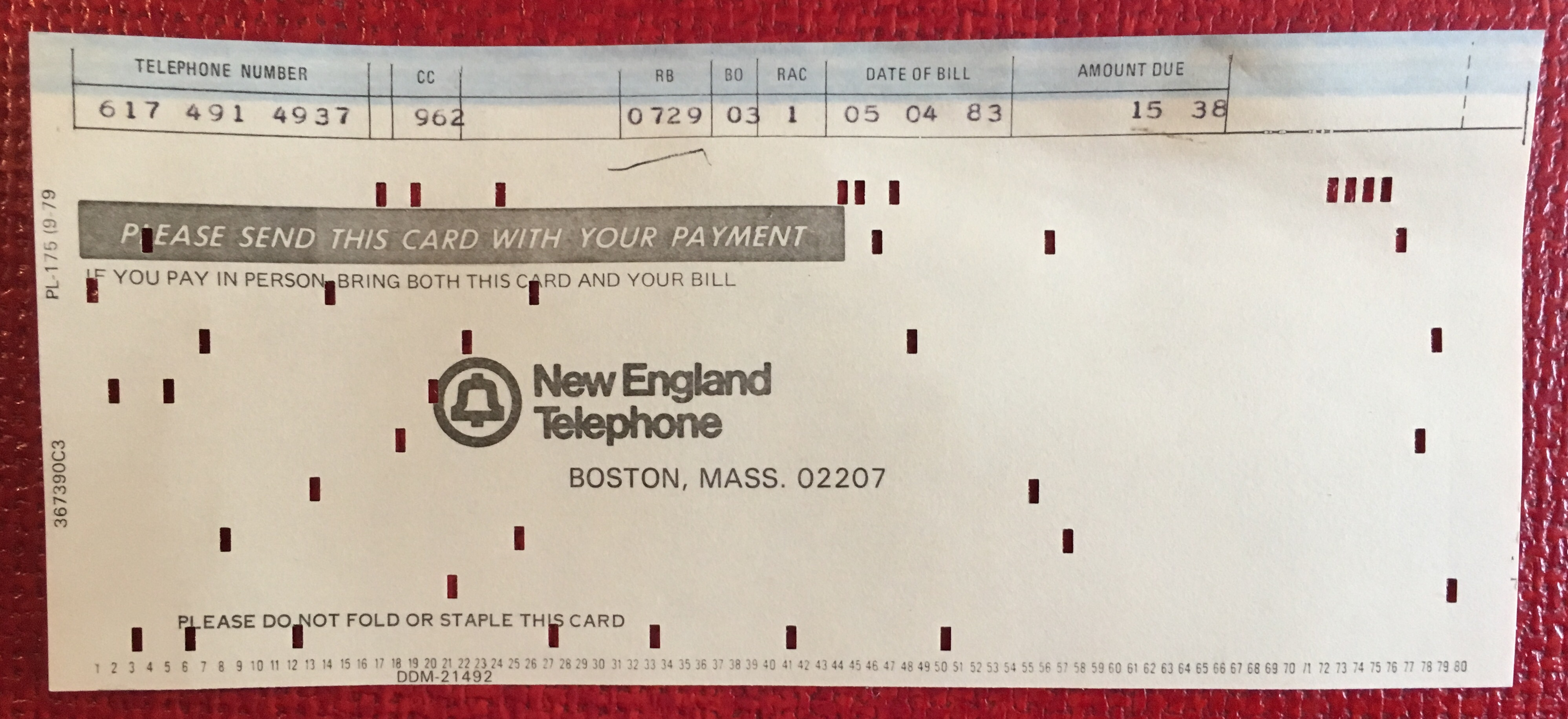
Punched card phone bill with interpreted data

The IBM 557 Alphabetic Interpreter allowed holes in punched cards to be interpreted and the punched card characters printed on any row or column, selected by a control panel. Introduced in 1954, the machine was a synchronous system where brushes would glide over a hole in a punched card and contact a brass roller thereby setting up part of a character code.

== Features ==
- Proof – where the 557 verified, again through electrical mechanical means, that the information printed was correct
- Multiple Stacker – the printed card could be placed in a selected output stacker
- Selective Line Print – the standard 557 could only print on the top two horizontal lines (between the 12 and 11 rows and between the 11 and 0 rows) – selective line print feature allowed printing on one of 26 lines
- 40 or 60 column card read – Standard punched card was 80 columns, but there were exceptions
- Master/detail printing – text on a master card could be printed on following detail cards

== Maintenance ==
The 557 was a maintenance headache. In reality it was 60 little printers. The sequence was as follows:

1. The punched card was fed from the card hopper and read by means of an electrical voltage placed onto a metal ‘Contact Roll’, timing controlled by a ‘Master Circuit Breaker, and 80 ‘Read Brushes’, one brush for each card column, and ‘Wire Contact Relays’ which decoded the data.
2. The punched card acted as an insulator and an electrical contact was only completed in the presence of a punched hole. A control panel controlled what function was to be performed by directing the impulse to a series of ‘wire contact relays’ with the impulses de-coded according to the Hollerith code. (Mark Sense could not provide the current needed to ‘pick’ a wire contact relay and so needed vacuum tubes to amplify the current). After the card was read, a ‘Card Gate’ moved into the card path to stop the card for printing on the correct horizontal line.
3. As the card was being read and positioned for printing, a ‘mechanical bail’ driven by large steel cams would raise 60 geared ‘lifter bars’ which engaged 60 ‘racks’ which engaged 60 ‘intermediate gears’, which drove 60 ‘print wheels’. (You can see the maintenance problem with 60 of just about everything). The lifter bars were then lowered under spring tension by the ‘mechanical bail’ in time with the reading of the punched card. Using the impulse from the ‘contact roll’ / ‘card brush’ / ‘wire contact relay’ circuitry, a ‘push rod’ would latch (stop) the individual ‘lifter bar’ on its downward motion with the character to be printed correctly positioned on the print wheel and facing 1 of 60 ‘print hammers’. An ‘alignment bail’ would then seat itself in between the teeth of the ‘print wheels’ to perform vertical alignment.
4. A ‘card shield’ would grab the punched card to hold it in place and lower it a position almost touching the inked print ribbon and print wheel. At the correct time 60 ‘hammers’, under spring tension and controlled by a cam, would ‘fire’ pressing the card / inked ribbon onto the print wheel and leaving an inked impression of the character on the surface of the punched card. There is a blank space on the print wheel for non-printing columns.
5. The printed card is then released by the ‘print shield’ into the ‘transport belts’ and moved to the stacker.

The 557 was prone to jamming of the lifter bars and resulted in what the CEs called a "rack and wheel" job. This meant stripping the machine down to its base and rebuilding it, an eight-hour job.

== See also ==
- Unit record equipment
- IBM 550 Numeric Interpreter
