= IBM 519 =

Copies or originates punched cards

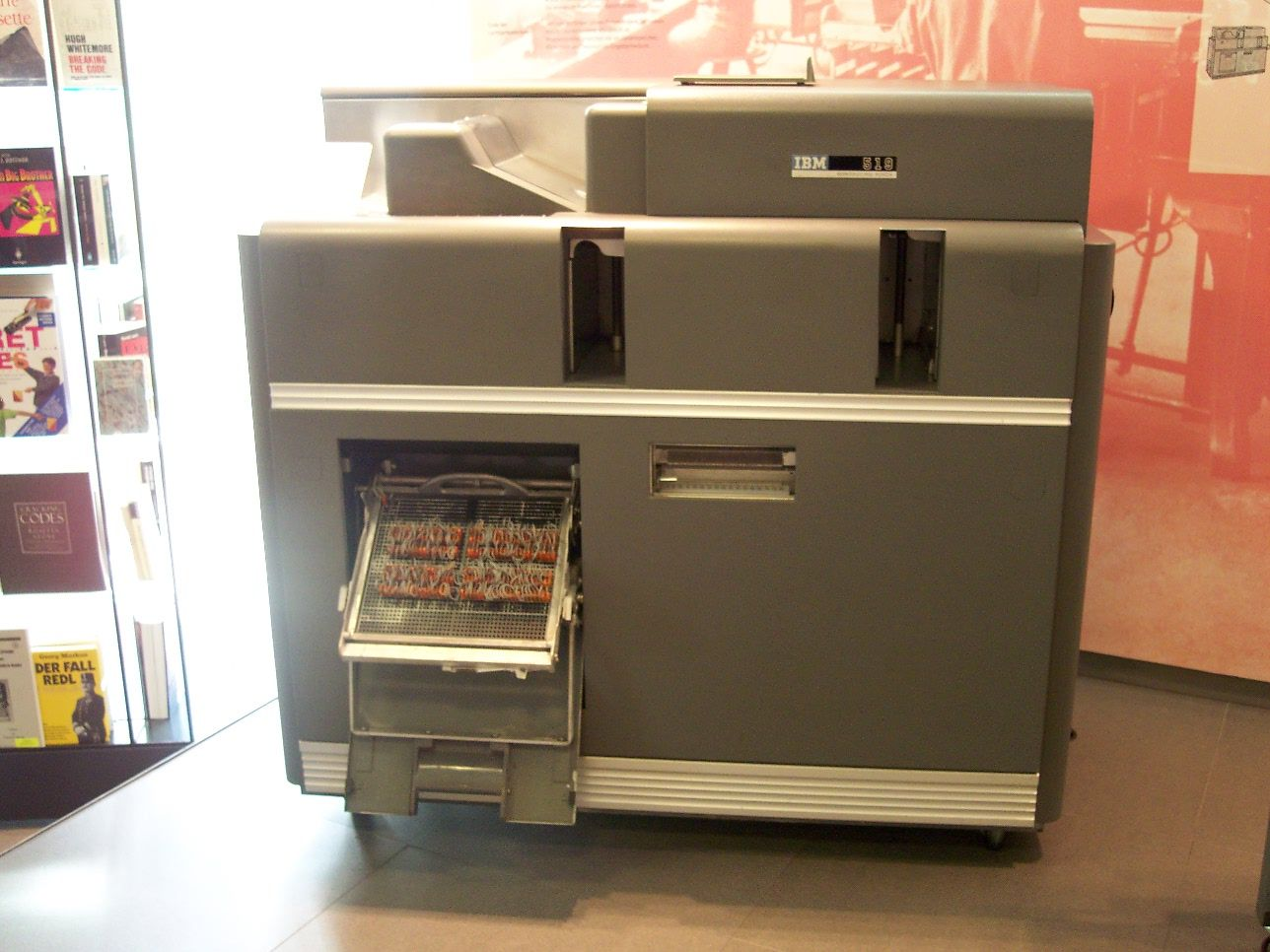
- An IBM 519 Document-Originating Machine with plugboard control panel open (it would be closed during operation).
- Type: Unit record equipment
- Released: 1946; 80 years ago

The IBM 519 Document-Originating Machine, introduced in 1946, was the last in a series of unit record machines designed for automated preparation of punched cards. Others in the series included the IBM 513 & IBM 514 Reproducing Punch.

The 519, which was "state of the art for the time", could:

- reproduce all or parts of the information on a set of cards
- "gangpunch" - copy information from a master card into the following detail cards
- print up to eight digits on the end of a card
- compare two decks of cards
- "summary punch" — create punch cards containing summary information provided by a connected accounting machine, such as totals from a group of processed cards
- "mark sense" — detect marks made with an electrographic pencil in designated locations on a punched card and then punch holes corresponding to those marks into the card
- number cards consecutively (an optional feature)

The reproducing, gangpunching, summary punching, and comparing features of the IBM 519 are very similar to those of the IBM 513 and IBM 514.

== IBM 513 Reproducing Punch ==
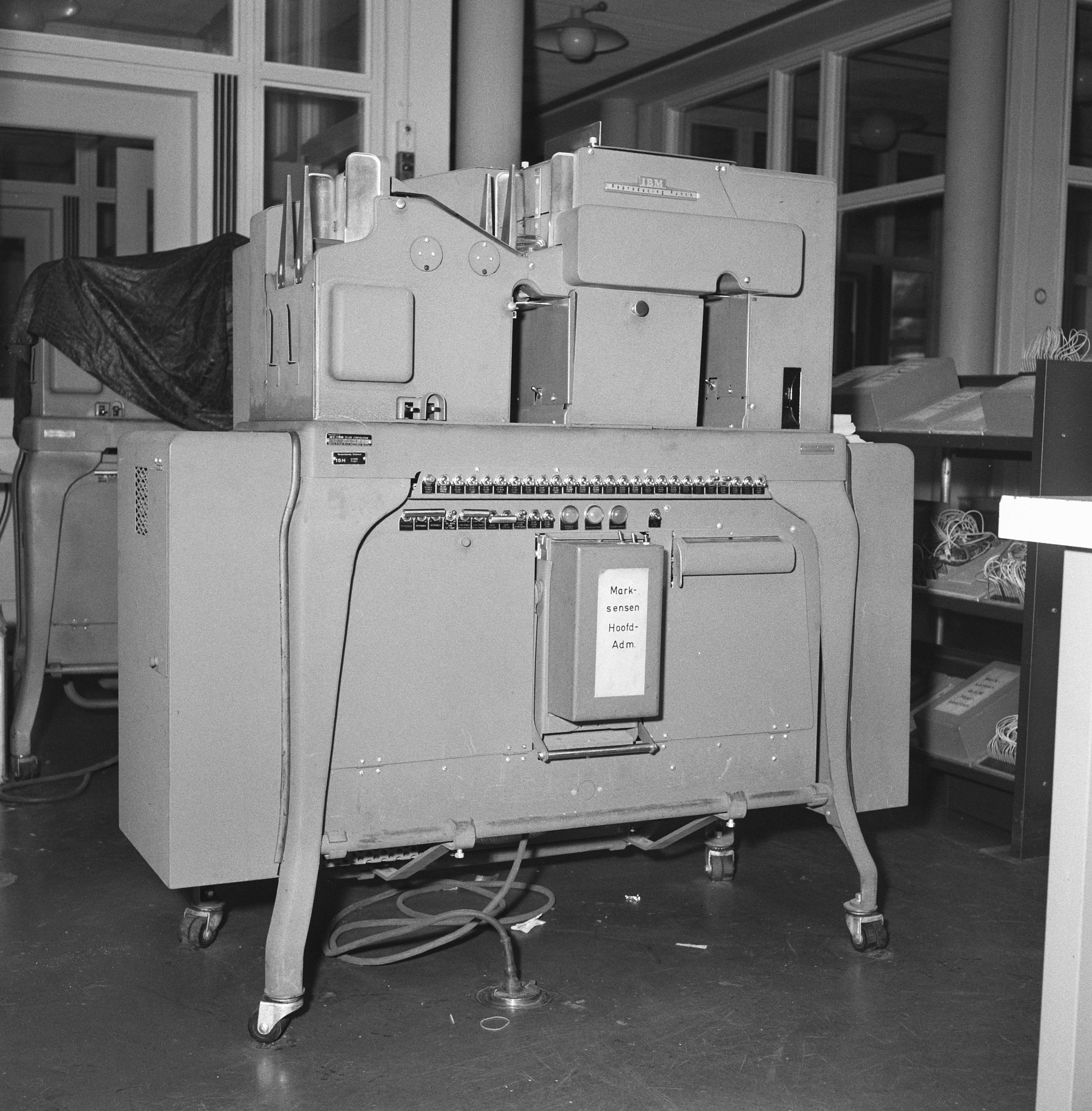
The IBM 513

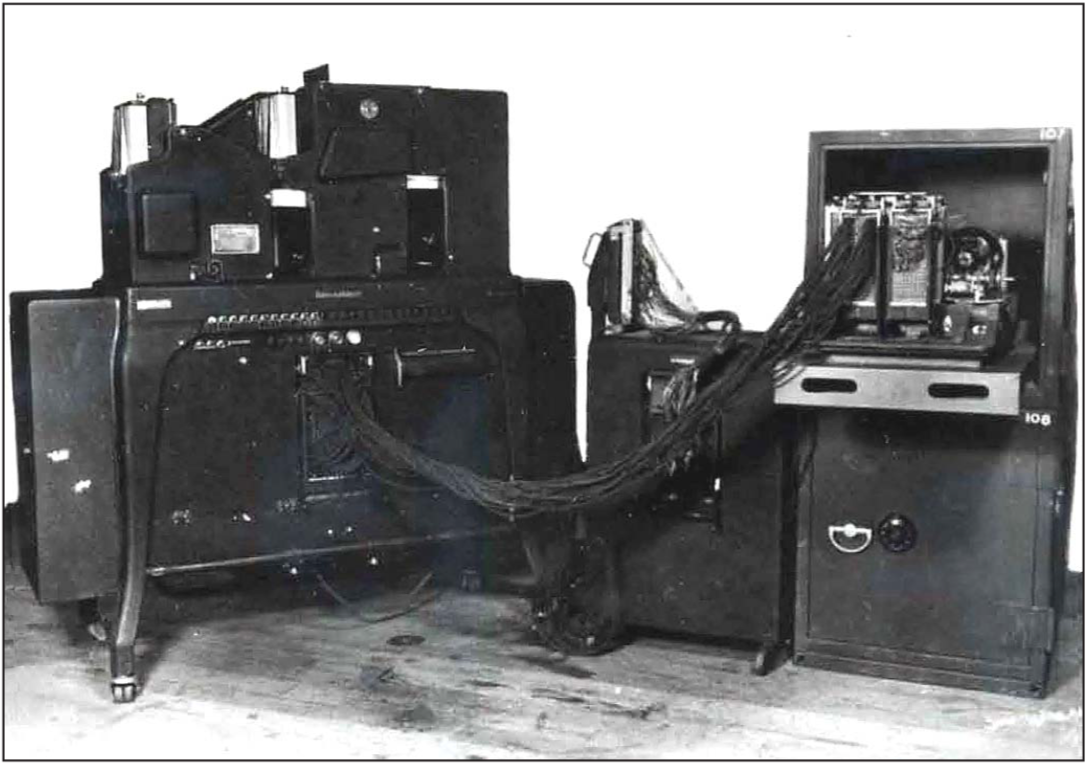
the IBM 513 (left), connected to a device used to generate keys for the SIGABA cipher machine during World War II

The IBM 513 Reproducing Punch, like the IBM 514, had some - but not all - of the capabilities included in the IBM 519. This model was released circa 1933.

== IBM 514 Reproducing Punch ==
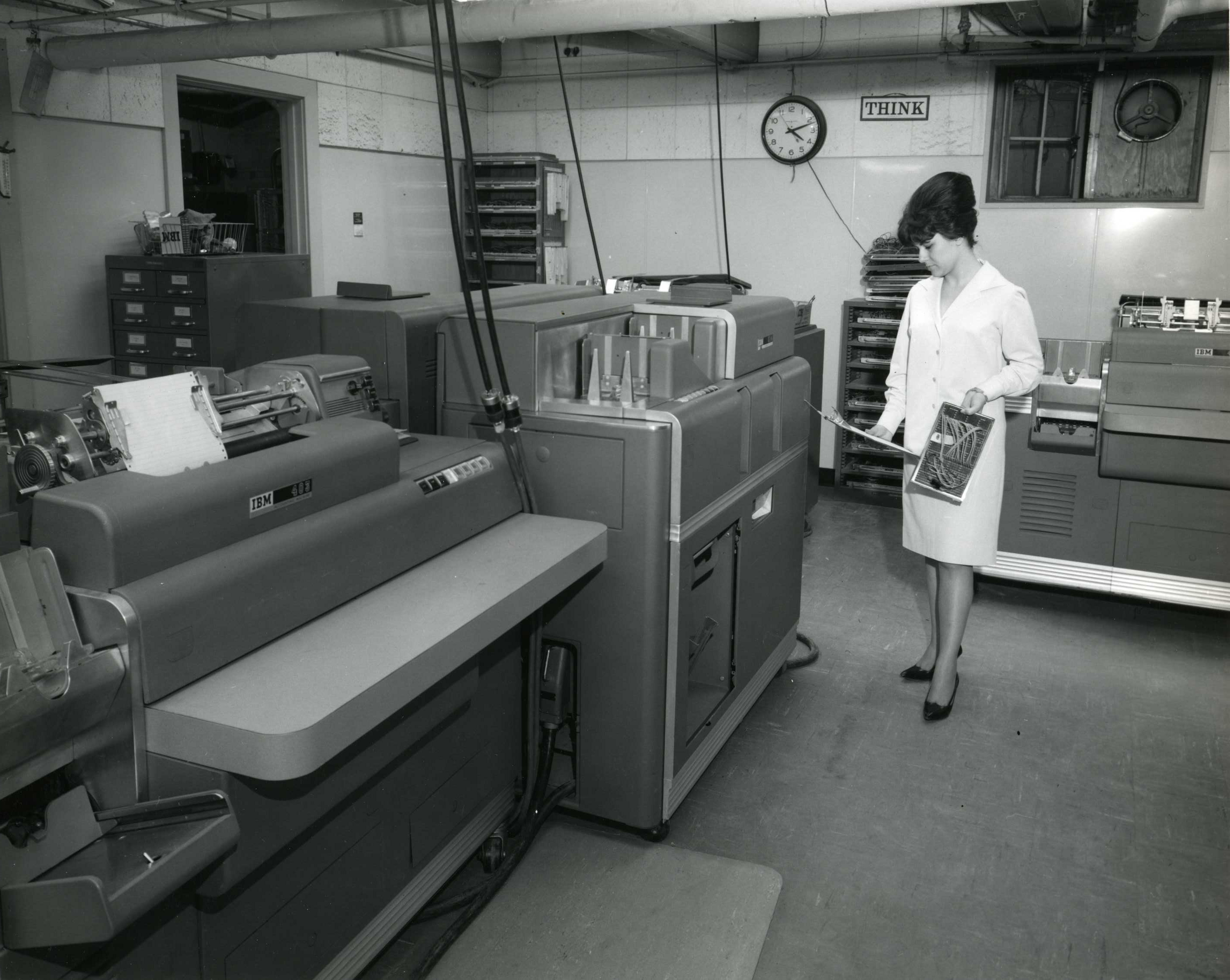
An IBM 514, center, attached to an IBM 403 accounting machine

The IBM 514 Reproducing Punch was introduced in February 1949. Like the 513, it had fewer capabilities than the IBM 519. The 514 was withdrawn in 1978.

The identifier "IBM 514" has been partially recycled in the form of "IBM 514 Watt(s) Hot-Swap Power Supply."

=== Capabilities table ===
Capability	513 Repro Punch	514 Repro Punch	519 Doc Mach.
Comparing	Yes	Yes	Yes
Editing	Yes	Yes	Yes
End Printing	—N/a	—N/a	Yes
Gangpunching	Yes	Yes	Yes
Mark-Sense; Punching	Yes	Yes	Yes
Reproducing	Yes	Yes	Yes
Summary Punching	Yes	Yes	Yes

The IBM 513, 514 and 519 all operated at 100 cards per minute, and their operations were directed by a removable control panel that was known as a plugboard. As with other IBM punched card devices that operated as automatic punches, cards are fed "face down, 12-edge first.". (On devices that operated as automatic readers, cards were fed "face down, 9-edge first instead.)

== History ==
Production of the IBM 519 was still going strong in 1956/1957, and production was consolidated to Rochester (for the Americas) and Milan, Italy. IBM closed its last punched card manufacturing plant in 1984, nearly a century after Herman Hollerith's 1886 construction of the first card sorting machine.
