= University of Iowa College of Education =

The University of Iowa College of Education is one of 11 colleges that compose the University of Iowa. It is located in Iowa City, Iowa. The College of Education is divided into four departments that include Educational Policy and Leadership Studies, Psychological and Quantitative Foundations, Rehabilitation and Counselor Education, and Teaching and Learning. Within those four departments, there are more than 20 specific academic programs, 500 undergraduate students, and 640 graduate students.

== Academic Programs ==
=== Educational Policy and Leadership Studies ===
This department has three graduate programs and enrolls 150 students.

- Educational Policy and Leadership Studies
- Higher Education and Student Affairs
- Schools, Culture, and Society

=== Psychological and Quantitative Foundations ===
This department has four graduate programs.

- Counseling Psychology
- Educational Psychology
- School Psychology
- Educational Measurement and Statistics

=== Rehabilitation and Counselor Therapy ===
This department has five graduate programs.

- Counselor Education and Supervision
- Couple and Family Therapy
- Rehabilitation Counselor Education
- Rehabilitation and Mental Health Counseling
- School Counseling

=== Teaching and Learning ===
This department prepares students, both undergraduate and graduate, to teach in a variety of fields.

- Art Education
- Developmental Reading
- Elementary Education
- English Education
- Foreign Language and ESL Education
- Language, Literacy, and Culture
- Mathematics Education
- Music Education
- Science Education
- Secondary Education
- Social Studies Education
- Special Education

== National Rankings ==
The College of Education and its programs rank competitively among the nation. U.S. News & World Report ranked the College of Education #40 for education schools.

Counseling Psychology (PhD)

- CounselingPsychology.org ranked the Counseling Psychology doctoral program as the eighth best out of 60 in the nation.

Elementary Education

- In 2014, the National Council on Teacher Quality ranked the College of Education's undergraduate elementary teaching preparation program as #44 out of 788 programs in the country.

Secondary Education

- In their 2014 report, the National Council on Teacher Quality ranked the secondary education preparation programs as #14 out of 816 programs in the United States and Canada.
- U.S. News & World Report ranked the secondary and education graduate program as #18 in the nation.

Educational Leadership

- The master's in educational leadership was ranked #13 on U.S. News & World Report's "Best Online Programs for Veterans."

Higher Education and Student Affairs

- The U.S. News & World Report ranked the Higher Education and Student Affairs graduate program as #15 in the nation.

== History ==
The University of Iowa was founded on February 25, 1847—exactly 59 days after Iowa officially became a state. Five out of the first six graduates received teacher education degrees. In addition, the University of Iowa was the first university in the nation to create a college-level department of education. From its inception, many discoveries and innovations have come from the University of Iowa College of Education. In 1945, Professor E.F. Lindquist created the Iowa Tests of Basic Skills, now called the Iowa Assessments, a standardized testing program for elementary and middle school students that is still used nationally today. In 1942, Professor Lindquist created the Iowa Tests of Educational Development, which tests high school students. Later in the 1950s, Professor Lindquist created the ACT, and also invented a machine that electronically scans and scores exams. Later, in the 1980s, The Connie Belin and Jacqueline N. Blank International Center for Gifted Education and Talent Development was created as Iowa’s first center for gifted education. The Belin-Blank Center has continued to pioneer research and programming for gifted education within the university, state, and country.

== Impact ==
The University of Iowa College of Education places special emphasis on working with school districts and students all across the state and nation. Professors, graduate students, and undergraduate students all have components of their work outside of the University of Iowa and inside local classrooms. Additionally, professors serve as experts on many national topics involving education.

- Talk to Text Program This is a two-day bootcamp for Cedar Rapids students to learn about technologies that can help students who have a challenging time with writing or typing. It is hosted by the Iowa Center for Assistive Technology Education and Research.
- Innovation Institute This is a two-week program on the University of Iowa campus that teaches high school students entrepreneurship and technical skills.
- African American Awareness Program This annual event is for Cedar Rapids middle school students who identify with African American culture. They tour the University of Iowa and participate in a book discussion.
- Invent Iowa This event has occurred since 1987, and it is Iowa's oldest STEM program. Since its inception, it has engaged more than one million K-12 students.
- Malik Henfield, professor in the Counselor Education and Supervision program, addressed the racial and equity gaps in ACT scores to Education Week.
- John Westefeld, a professor in Counseling Psychology, shared his insight in suicide after the death of comedian, Robin Williams.
- Deborah Linebarger, an associate professor and director of the Children's Media Lab, presented her research on the effects of TV programs on the learning of babies and toddlers.
- David Tjaden was named to Forbes's 30 under 30 in education for his work leading the National Education Association Student Program.
- Leslie Flynn, a science education professor, serves on a state task force to review the Next Generation Science Standards.
