= IBM 101 =

The IBM 101 Electronic Statistical Machine, introduced in 1952, combines in one unit the functions of sorting, counting, accumulating, balancing, editing, and printing of summaries of facts recorded in IBM cards.

The 101 could sort cards based on multiple columns. For example, if a card had multiple 3-column test scores, the 101 could be wired to sort into pocket 0 those cards with no scores over 090, into pocket 1 those with one score over 090, and so on; logic limited only by the number of relays available.

A. Ross Eckler suggests the development of the 101, with functions similar to earlier multicolumn sorters and unit counters developed by the Census Bureau, "was apparently a direct result of the transfer to IBM of Lawrence Wilson, who had served as chief of the Census Bureau's Machine Tabulation Division".

== Functions ==
The following operations may be performed at the rate of 450 cards per minute:

- Sort IBM cards into numeric or alphabetic sequence
- Arrange cards into a desired pattern
- Check cards for consistency of coded information
- Check the accuracy of sorting
- Search cards for specific facts or combinations of facts
- Count cards for as many as 60 different classifications
- Print reports in final form on one or two printers
- Print group identification
- Print a check symbol on each line of a report to indicate that totals printed on that line cross-check
- Summary punch totals when one or two summary punches are connected to the 101.

The operation of the 101 is directed by the use of a removable control panel.

== Related Equipment ==
IBM Devices often used in conjunction with an IBM 101 included:

=== Capabilities table ===
Capability	514 Repro Punch	519 Doc Mach.	521 Punch Unit	523 Gang Punch	524 Dup Punch	526 Print Summ	528 Accum Repro	529 Punch Unit	541 Read Punch	542 Read Punch	549 Ticket Conv.
Accumulating							Yes				
Comparing	Yes	Yes					Yes				
Editing	Yes	Yes	Yes	Yes			Yes	Yes	Yes	Yes	Yes
End Printing		Yes									
Gangpunching	Yes	Yes	Yes	Yes			Yes	Yes	Yes	Yes	
Input-Output for a System			Yes					Yes	Yes	Yes	
Mark-Sense; Punching	Yes	Yes									
Reproducing	Yes	Yes					Yes				Yes
Summary Punching	Yes	Yes		Yes	Yes	Yes	Yes				Yes

=== IBM 524 ===
The IBM 524 is a Duplicating Summary Punch, and two of them can be attached to an IBM 101.

=== Other units ===
- IBM 514 (Reproducing Punch)
- IBM 519 Document-Originating Machine
- IBM 521 Punch Unit
- IBM 523 Gang Summary Punch
- IBM 526 Printing Summary Punch
- IBM 528 Accumulating Reproducer
- IBM 529 Punch Unit
- IBM 541 Card Read Punch
- IBM 542 Card Read Punch
- IBM 549 Ticket Converter

== Gangpunch ==
The term gangpunch refers to duplicating the content of a punched card onto one or more of those that follow - to copy information from a master card into the following detail cards.
