= Turnaround document =

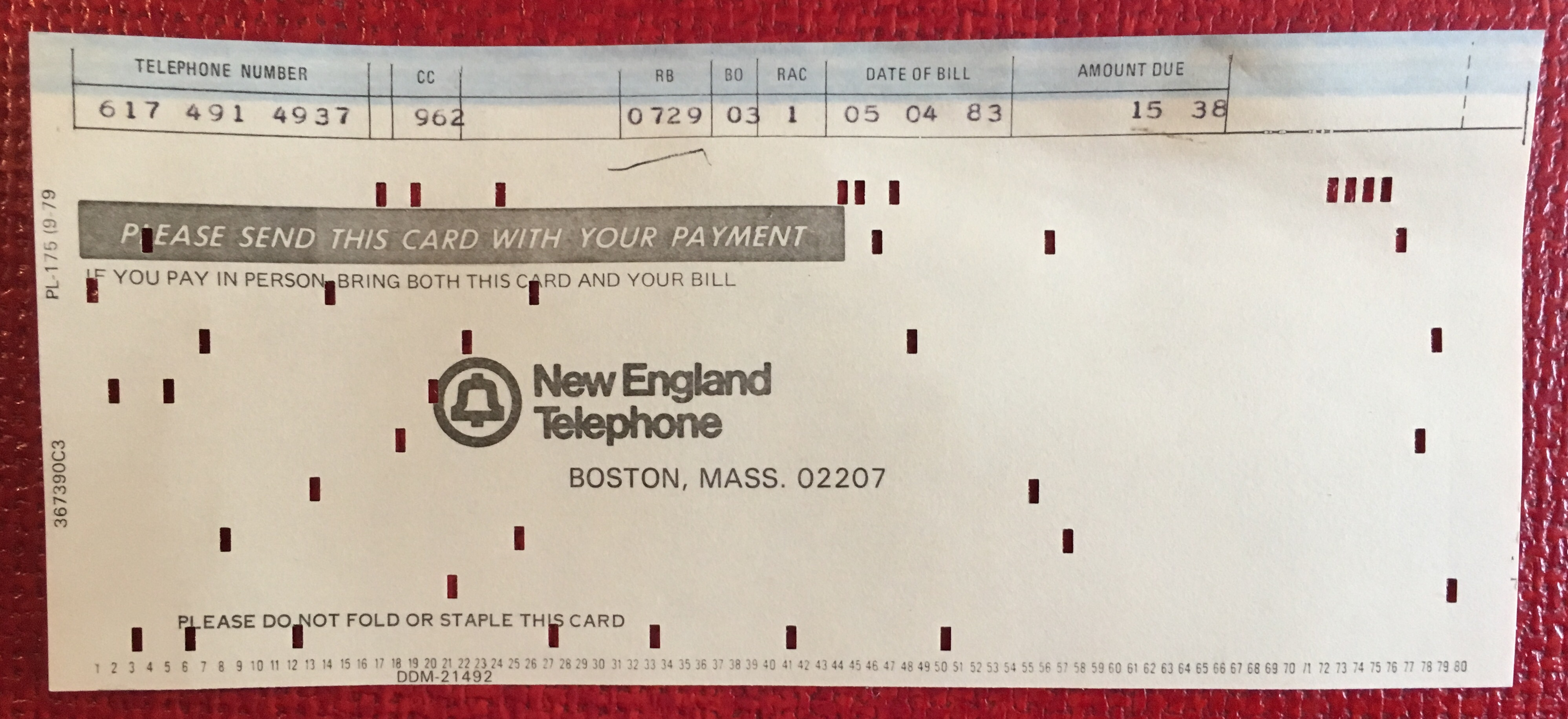
Punched card turnaround document included as part of a phone bill in 1983

A turnaround document is a paper document containing computer-generated output that can also be used as a computer input, usually after the addition of some extra information by the user.

For example, meter cards are produced for collecting readings from gas meters, photocopiers, water meters, etc. The cards are filled in by the customer and then returned to the company for scanning using ICR (intelligent character recognition) to quickly produce customer bills. Earlier versions used punched cards, sometimes with mark sense technology. The use of meter cards has largely been replaced by fully-electronic systems including billing and payment over the internet.
