= IBM 550 =

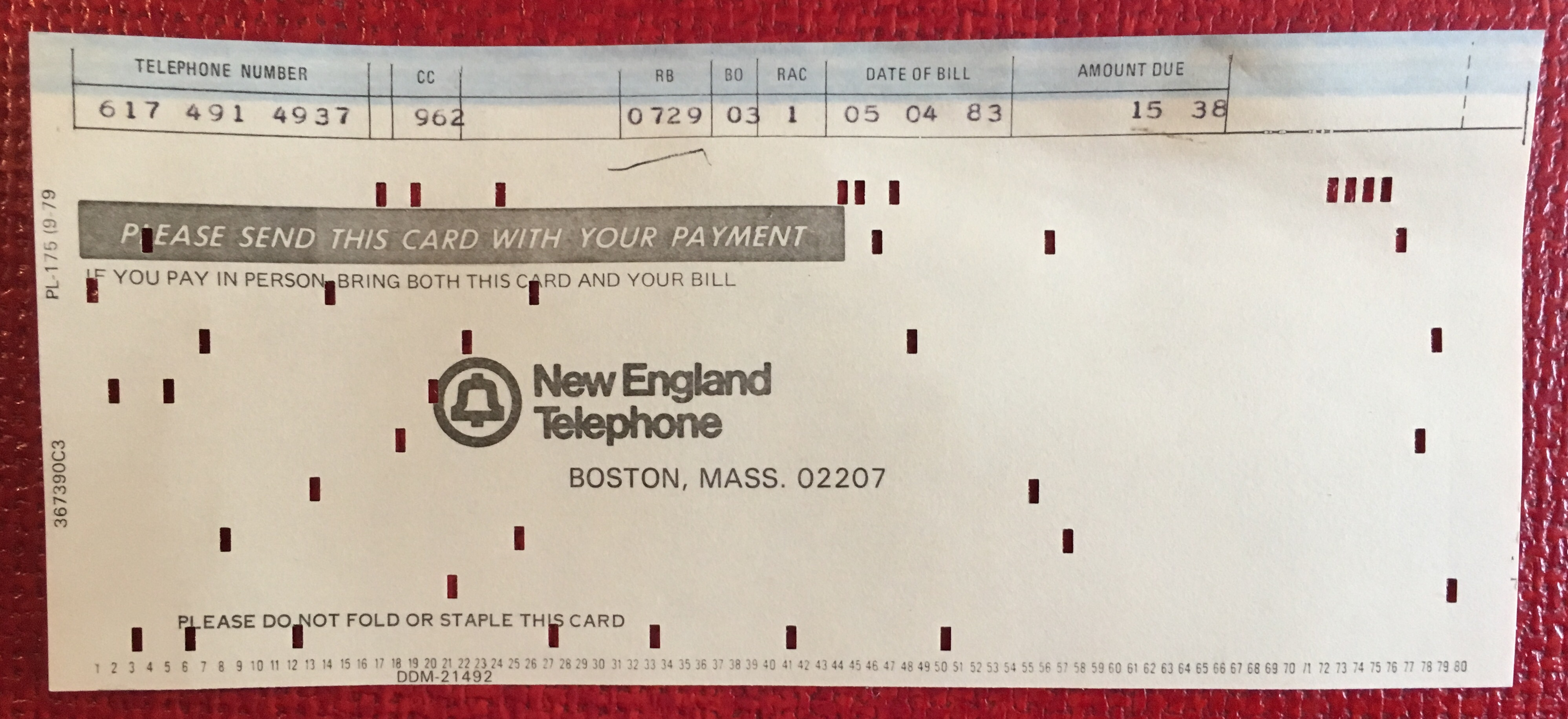
Punched card phone bill with interpreted data

The IBM 550 numerical interpreter was the first commercial machine made by IBM that read numerical data punched on cards and printed it across the top of each card. The 550 was introduced in 1930.

Information to be printed could be placed in any sequence via plugboard control panel selections. The machine operated at the rate of 75 cards a minute. The feed hopper had a capacity of 800 cards, and the stacker had a capacity of 1,000 cards.

Alphabetic and numeric characters could be printed by the Type 552 alphabetic interpreter, announced in 1937. It could process 60 cards per minute. The Type 552 was withdrawn in December 1957.

== See also ==
- Unit record equipment
- IBM 557 Alphabetic Interpreter
