= Iowa Assessments =

Standardized tests for U.S. primary students

The Iowa Assessments (previously the Iowa Test of Basic Skills and originally Iowa Every Pupil Test of Basic Skills) also known informally as the Iowa Tests, formerly known as the ITBS tests or the Iowa Basics, are standardized tests provided as a service to schools by the College of Education of the University of Iowa. Developers Everett Franklin Lindquist, Harry Greene, Ernest Horn, Maude McBroom, and Herbert Spitzer first designed and administered the tests in 1935 as a tool for improving student instruction. The tests are administered to students in kindergarten through eighth grade as part of the Iowa Statewide Testing Programs, a division of the Iowa Testing Programs (ITP). Over decades, participation expanded and currently nearly all school districts in Iowa participate annually in the program, as do many other school districts across the United States. In a cooperative relationship, participating schools receive ITBS test materials, scoring and reporting services and consultation in the use of ITBS for instructional purposes, and ITP utilizes participation by schools in research and test development. Both the ITBS and Iowa Tests of Educational Development (ITED) were revised in the 2011–2012 school year. They were rebranded the Iowa Assessments. In 2016–2017, Iowa Assessments launched their new testing program, Next Generation Iowa Assessments.

== Content ==
ITBS are written in levels 5–14. Each test level consists of a series of tests administered in content sections with each section designed to measure specific skills. Test levels 5-8 are administered to students from kindergarten through second grade (K-2). School districts employ the series of tests in primary grades to gain information about classes and students for instructional planning, to supplement teacher observations regarding student abilities, and to establish a basis for subsequent annual evaluation of student progress. Sections for levels 5-8 include: Vocabulary, Word Analysis, Reading Comprehension, Listening, Language, Mathematics, Social Studies (Levels 7 and 8 only), Science (Levels 7 and 8 only), and Sources of Information.

Test levels 9-14 are administered to students from third grade through twelfth grade. Like test levels 5–8, the primary purpose of levels 9-14 is instructional development. School districts use the standardized achievement battery to learn supplementary information useful in choosing curriculum and lesson planning. Teachers may use ITP testing batteries to suggest areas where the skills of individual students are most and least developed. Sections for levels 9-14 include: Vocabulary, Reading Comprehension, Spelling, Capitalization, Punctuation, Usage and Expression, Math Concepts and Estimation, Math Problem Solving and Data Interpretation, Math Computation, Social Studies, Maps and Diagrams, Reference Materials, Word Analysis (Level 9 only), and Listening (Level 9 only).
