= National Council on Teacher Quality =

Think tanks based in Washington, D.C.

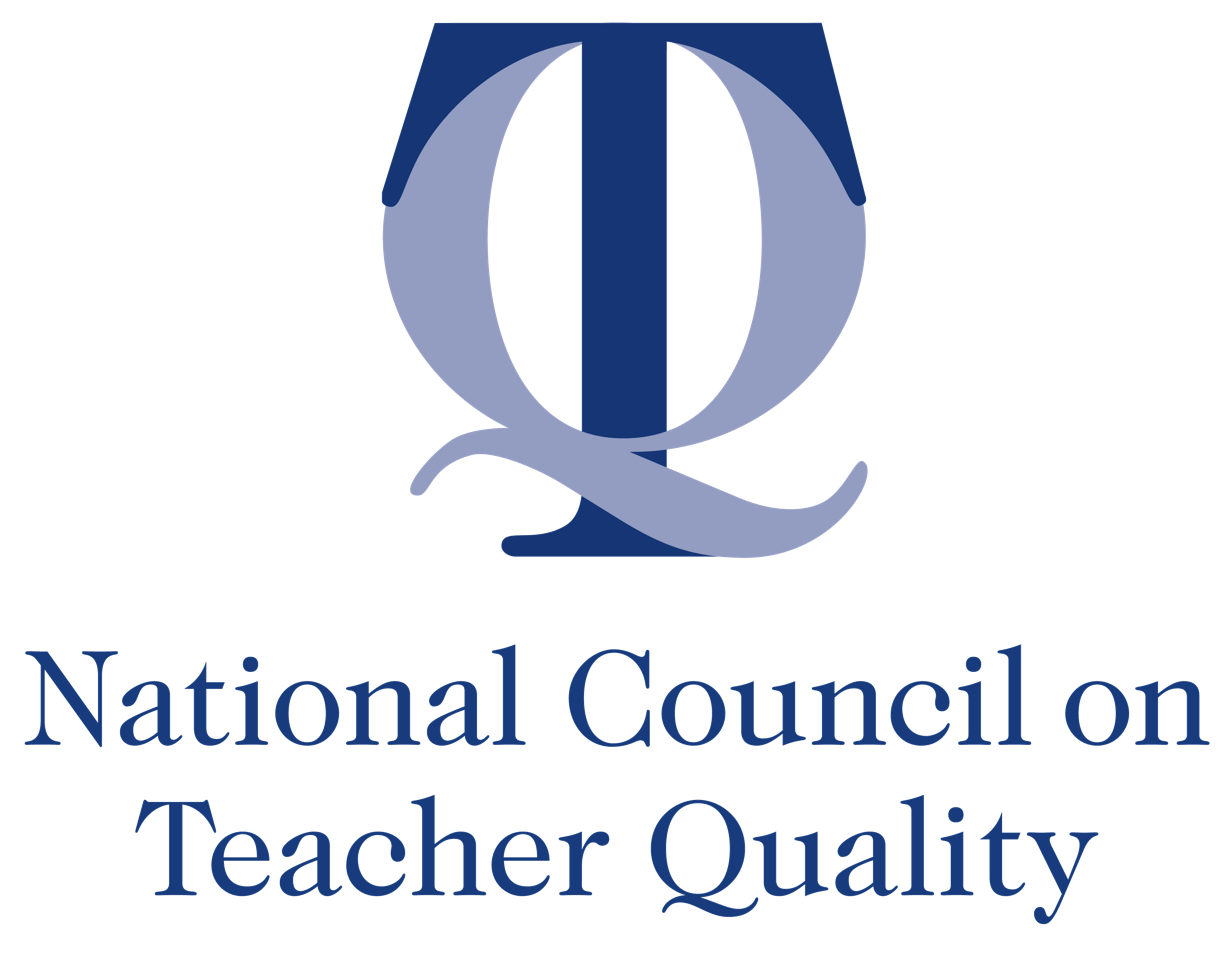
- Abbreviation: NCTQ
- Formation: 2000; 26 years ago
- Purpose: Education reform
- Headquarters: Washington, D.C.
- President: Heather Peske
- Website: nctq.org

The National Council on Teacher Quality (NCTQ) is a think tank founded in 2000 and based in Washington, D.C. that researches, evaluates, and provides information and guidance on the topics of teacher preparation, teacher pay, educator equity, and diversity. It is primarily known for its Teacher Prep Review, a report first released in June 2013 with subsequent editions in 2014, 2016, 2017, 2018, and 2020, that found American teacher education programs largely inadequate.

== History ==
The National Council on Teacher Quality was founded in 2000 by the Thomas B. Fordham Institute. The council advocates for more rigorous teacher preparation, performance pay or merit-based teacher pay systems, educator equity, and a more diverse teacher workforce. Diane Ravitch, who was on its board at its founding, said they were conservatives who thought that teacher training institutions were "too concerned about self-esteem and social justice and not concerned enough with basic skills and academics." Its board once contained members of the Reagan, Clinton, and Bush administrations. The organization is based in Washington, D.C. and headed by Heather Peske.

== Teacher Prep Review ==
Through an exhaustive and unprecedented examination of how these schools operate, the Review finds [teacher education programs] have become an industry of mediocrity, churning out first-year teachers with classroom management skills and content knowledge inadequate to thrive in classrooms with ever-increasing ethnic and socioeconomic student diversity.

— NCTQ Teacher Prep Review 2013, Executive Summary

On June 18, 2013, NCTQ released its first report and rankings of teacher preparation programs, the Teacher Prep Review, via news magazine U.S. News & World Report's website. The report found that teacher education programs did not satisfactorily prepare teachers, and referred to the field as "an industry of mediocrity". The study surveyed over a thousand programs, and rated them with exceptionally low scores overall. Less than 10 percent of the schools listed received three or more stars out of four, and only four schools received four full stars. The Associated Press's Philip Elliott and PBS NewsHour's John Merrow called the report "scathing". The report stated that teacher education programs did not adequately return its students' monetary and time investments, or prepare first-year teachers with content knowledge and classroom management skills fit for diverse classrooms. Its suggestions for rectifying these problems were raising the criteria for admission to the programs and teaching "the most effective methods to help students".

The rankings were based on 18 standards decided over eight years and 10 pilot studies. The study requested information from teacher education programs including textbooks, syllabi, graduate surveys, and admissions requirements. The report covers 1,130 teacher education programs, representing 99 percent of the field, though only 114 institutions fully cooperated. About 700 institutions did not, in objection to the report's methodology. PBS NewsHour's John Merrow said that only 1% of institutions agreed to participate, which was a "boycott." The institutions felt that Kate Walsh had come to her conclusions before she started the study. But Merrow called it a "bad study," because they didn't go to campuses, but just read course catalogs and syllabi. However, it was also noted that, "this study (and the continued follow-up work of NCTQ) will have lasting impact on policy and practice—perhaps more so than any study in the past decade."

In total, 608 institutions were included in the report. The council filed lawsuits in some cases to collect documents from schools that abstained. Of the 608 schools ranked out of four stars, 162 received no stars, 301 received one star, 100 received three or more, and only four received four full stars.

NCTQ's Kate Walsh has said that her group intended to build a "consumer tool" based on measurable standards to inform consumers and drive change. Subsequent editions of the Teacher Prep Review were published in 2014, 2016, 2017, 2018, and 2020.

New data and analysis released in 2020 found teacher preparation made “significant progress on the science of reading instruction”. For the first time since 2013 the number of programs in the nation to reflect reading science has reached 51 percent, up from 35 percent seven years ago. However, the study found that only 19 states require aspiring teachers to pass a test that shows they've mastered research-based methods for teaching children to read. Former U.S. Secretary of Education Arne Duncan commented on the report, saying, "“There has been a great deal of cynicism—and I include myself—regarding the capacity of teacher prep to make changes. I thank the National Council on Teacher Quality for refusing to turn their attention away from this issue. This progress gives me real hope."

=== Response ===
The Associated Press's Philip Elliott wrote that the report was "designed" to provoke teacher education programs to change the teacher skills taught in their curricula. Delaware Governor Jack Markell agrees with the organization, having passed earlier legislation to raise teacher prep entrance requirements. Michael Petrilli of the Fordham Institute similarly argued in favor of higher entrance standards.

Diane Ravitch said that she disagreed with the premises of the report, which were "data-mania" and standardized testing, which undermine love of learning and engagement with ideas. University of Kansas School of Education Dean Rick Ginsberg called the report's methodology "ridiculous", comparing it to an unsatisfactory student research paper. American Federation of Teachers president Randi Weingarten agreed that teacher education needed improvement, but said that the report resorted to "attention-grabbing consumer alerts based on incomplete standards" where it could have lifted the teaching profession with "a consistent, systemic approach". PBS NewsHour's John Merrow reported that many schools saw the results as a foregone conclusion based on NCTQ president Kate Walsh's reputation as "a harsh critic of teacher education" and thus refused to participate.

The report's main criticisms were for not physically visiting programs, talking to students, or consulting the districts that hire the program graduates, and instead grading schools by online and received documents, such as course syllabi. Critics agreed that teacher education program admissions criteria needed improvement.

=== Teacher Policy Work ===
NCTQ's Teacher Contract Database houses information on teacher policies on over 145 school districts, representing the 100 largest districts in the country plus the largest district in each state. Users can learn more about a teacher’s life in those districts, from salaries and benefits to evaluation policies, length of school day and year and many other topics.

The State Teacher Policy Database, previously the State Teacher Policy Yearbook, presents state snapshots on teacher policy regarding teacher preparation, recruitment and retention, and provides guidance to states on policy changes that improve teacher quality. There is a national overview and state analyses, and editions have been published biannually since 2011.
