= Toy of the Year =

Toy of the Year may refer to:

- Toy of the Year award at the American International Toy Fair (US trade fair)
- Toy of the Year award by the Toy Retailers Association (UK trade body)
- Toy of the Year award in Parenting (magazine) (US magazine)
- German Game of the Year award Spiel des Jahres (German board and card game award)
- Speciality Toy of the Year award by the Toy Industry Association (US trade association)
