= IBM 805 Test Scoring Machine =

Test scoring machine released by IBM

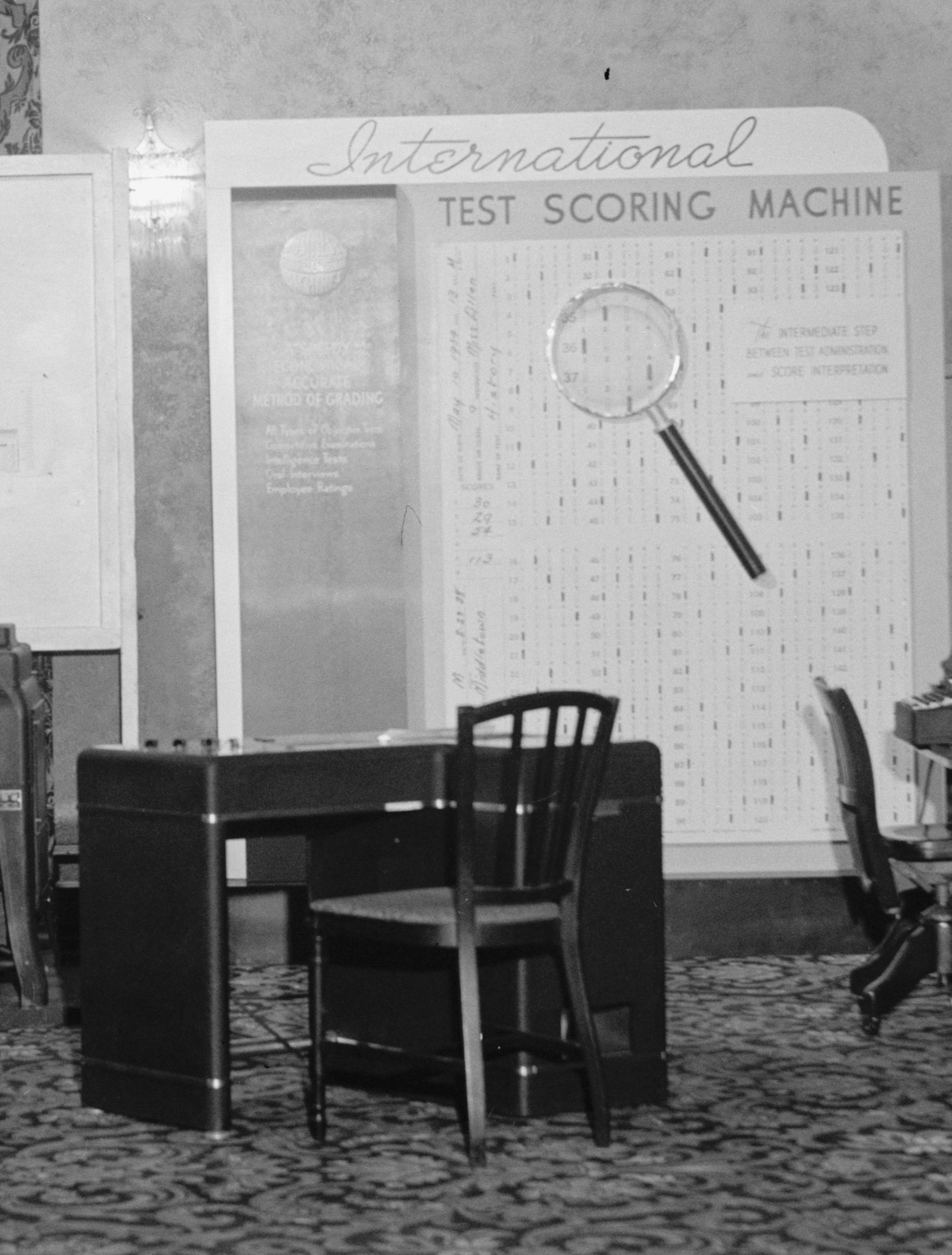

The IBM 805 Test Scoring Machine was an educational machine sold by IBM beginning in 1937. The device scored answer sheets marked with special "mark sense" pencils. The machine was developed from a prototype developed by Reynold Johnson, a school teacher who later became an IBM engineer. That machine and its descendants have been in use ever since.

== See also ==
- Benjamin D. Wood

== External link ==
Video of an electrographic pencil that was used for the test scoring machine
