= Mark sense =

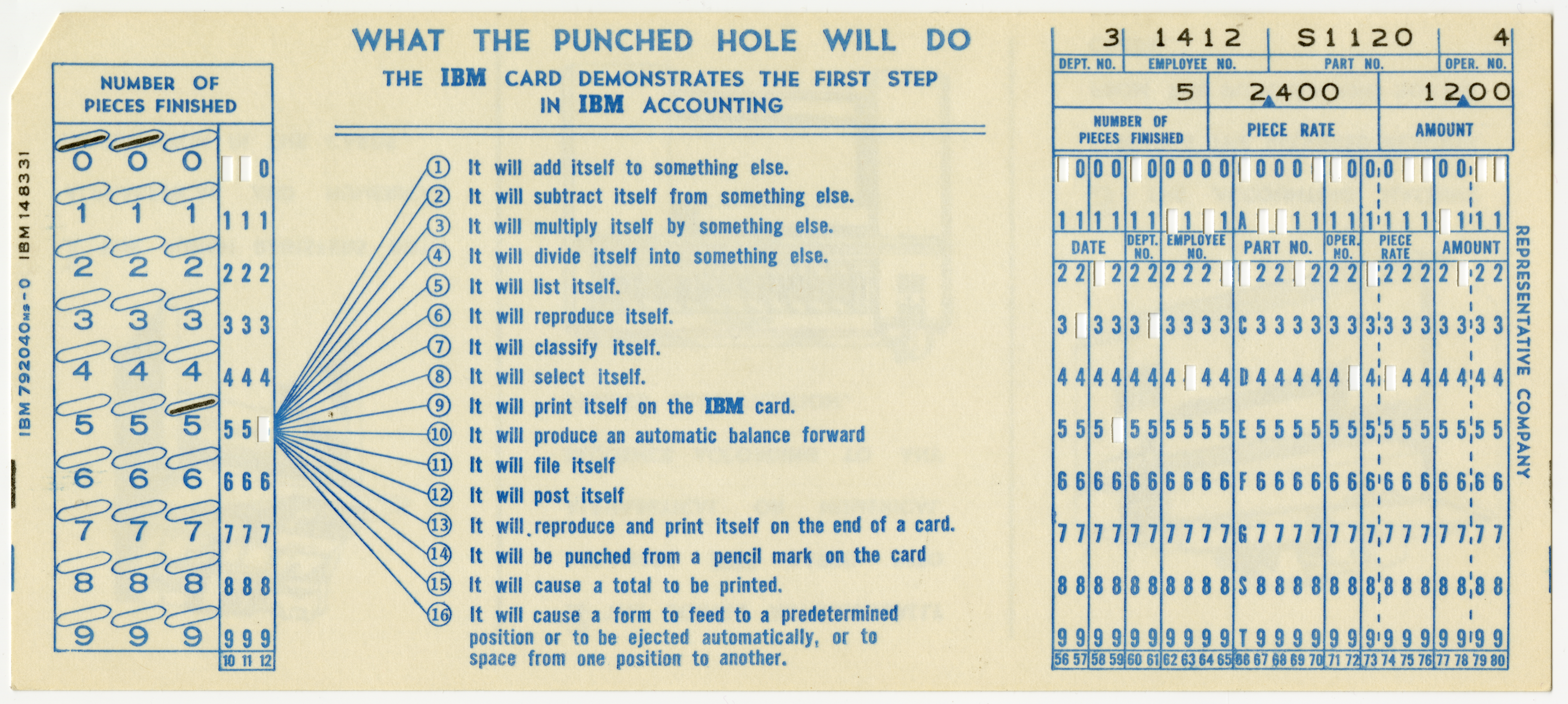
A sample mark sense punched card

Electrographic is a term used for punched-card and page-scanning technology that allowed cards or pages marked with a pencil to be processed or converted into punched cards. The primary developer of electrographic systems was IBM, who used mark sense as a trade name for both the forms and processing system. The term has since come to be used generically for any technology allowing marks made using ordinary writing implements to be processed, encompassing both optical mark recognition and electrographic technology.

The term "mark sense" is not generally used when referring to technology that distinguishes the shape of the mark; the general term optical character recognition is generally used when mark shapes are distinguished. Because the term mark-sense was originally a trade name, the Federal Government generally used the term electrographic.

In the 1940s, 50s, and 60s, mark sense technology was widely used for applications like processing meter readings recordings on turnaround documents and recording long distance telephone calls. Many thousands of pencils were made expressly for mark sense applications by the Dur-O-Lite Pencil Company and by the Autopoint Company. Many of the pencils made for the "Bell System" were stamped "MARK SENSE LEAD" and for the Federal Government, "US Government Electrographic."

In the early 1930s, science teacher Reynold B. Johnson developed an automatic test scoring machine. IBM bought Johnson's invention and hired him as an engineer - the machine was sold as the IBM 805 Test Scoring Machine. The first large-scale use of the IBM 805 was by the American Council on Education's Cooperative Test Service in 1936; in 1947, the Cooperative Test Service became part of the Educational Testing Service. Johnson went on to develop a range of electrographic mark-sense machinery.

Various IBM equipment could be used with mark sense cards including the IBM 513 and IBM 514 Reproducing Punches, the IBM 557 Alphabetic Interpreter, and the IBM 519 Electric Document Originating Machine.

== See also ==
- Turnaround document
