= Iowa Tests of Educational Development =

Iowan standardized test

The Iowa Tests of Educational Development (ITED) are a set of standardized tests given annually to high school students in many schools in the United States, covering Grades 9 to 12. The tests were created by the University of Iowa's College of Education in 1942, as part of a program to develop a series of nationally accepted standardized achievement tests. The primary goal of the ITED is to provide information to assist educators in improving teaching.

== Goals of the ITED ==
Rather than testing a student's content knowledge, the ITED endeavors to evaluate students' skills in a variety of areas, especially based on problem solving and critical analysis of texts. These are considered by the authors of the ITED to be skills acquired across multiple curricular areas and skills that are important for academic success. Within the skill areas evaluated by the ITED, the test is designed to elicit information about a student's current skill level, growth and abilities within each area tested. The ITED is designed to examine and compare a student's ability in several educational fields, including vocabulary, reading comprehension, language, spelling, mathematical concepts and problem solving, computation, analysis of social studies materials, analysis of science materials, and use of sources. Although the test is broken up into these fields, the goal of the ITED is to track the development of the skills and analysis needed in each of these areas rather than the content.

== ITED Sections ==
=== Vocabulary ===
The vocabulary section of the ITED focuses on testing the development of students' vocabulary for everyday communication.

=== Reading Comprehension ===
The reading comprehension section of the ITED tests literal understanding as well as the higher-level skills of inference and analysis.

=== Language: Revising Written Materials ===
The language section of the ITED focuses on students' ability to revise and edit texts, include issues of style and clarity as well as grammatical errors.

=== Spelling ===
The ITED spelling test presents students with groups of words; students must indicate which word is misspelled or whether they are all spelled correctly.

=== Mathematics: Concepts and Problem Solving ===
This section focuses on problem solving and logical thinking skills rather than mathematical computation. Some questions require basic computation while others require students to determine the steps necessary to solve a problem without actually completing the problem itself.

=== Analysis of Social Studies Materials ===
This ITED section requires students to analyze information presented to them and will often contain documents including maps, graphs and reading passages.

=== Analysis of Science Materials ===
The science materials section of the ITED evaluates students' familiarity and comfort with scientific procedures and their ability to understand and analyze scientific information and methods.

=== Sources of Information ===
The sources of information section tests students' ability to do research and to use the resources available to them to find information.

== Uses of the ITED ==
The ITED is used in the majority of schools in the state of Iowa, both in the public and private education sectors, and the tests have found some use in other regions of the United States. The ITED is administered in the fall and results are used along with classroom observation and student work by teachers to evaluate the progress of a student's abilities. The ITED results are also used by the state of Iowa to monitor schools' progress and determine if schools and students are meeting goals. Individual student ITED results are used to help determine placements and tracks. The ITED helps educators and students plan student schedules by providing information for the school to use in placing students in classes of varying levels of difficulty. The results also provide information about students' academic potential, assisting students and school advisors as they make their high school course selections and plan for college. The ITED is scored based on the number of questions a student answered correctly. Research has indicated that there is a correlation between ITED scores and student grade point averages (GPAs), although these correlations were lower than expected and lower than indicated by prior research.

== See also ==
- Education in the United States
- High school—United States
- Iowa education
- Iowa Tests of Basic Skills
- Secondary education in the United States
- Standardized tests
